= Criminal law in the Marshall Court =

Chief Justice John Marshall

The Marshall Court (1801–1835) heard forty-one criminal law cases, slightly more than one per year. Among such cases are United States v. Simms (1803), United States v. More (1805), Ex parte Bollman (1807), United States v. Hudson (1812), Cohens v. Virginia (1821), United States v. Perez (1824), Worcester v. Georgia (1832), and United States v. Wilson (1833).

During Marshall's tenure, the Supreme Court had no general appellate jurisdiction in criminal cases. The Court could review criminal convictions from the state courts, but not the lower federal courts, via writs of error. It only did so twice. The Court could hear original habeas petitions, but disclaimed the authority to grant the writ post-conviction unless the sentence had already been completed. Thus, the majority of the Marshall Court's opinions on criminal law were issued in response to questions certified by divided panels of the circuit courts by a certificate of division.

Most of the Marshall Court's criminal opinions involved defining the elements of federal crimes. Criminal statutes considered by the Court during this period involved assimilative crimes, counterfeiting, embargoes, insurance fraud, piracy, and slave trading. But, the Court twice disclaimed the authority to define common law crimes not proscribed by Congressional statute.

The Marshall Court also issued important opinions regarding criminal procedure. Although the Court did not explicitly cite or quote constitutional provisions, its opinions remain influential in interpreting the Double Jeopardy Clause of the Fifth Amendment and venue provision of Article Three. The Court also laid down the common law rules of evidence in federal courts, including the hearsay exception for party admissions and the narrowing of the best evidence rule.

== Background ==
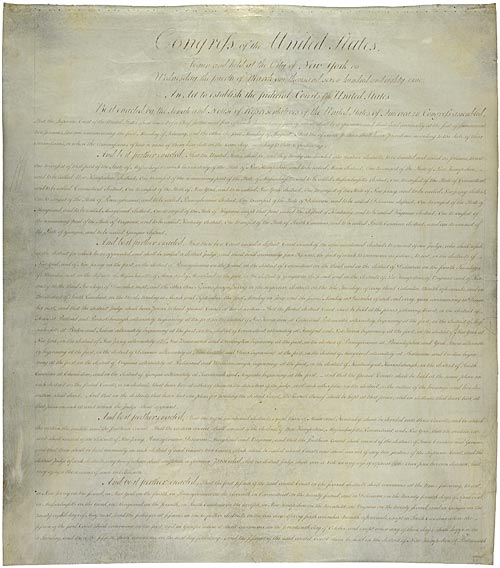
The Judiciary Act of 1789

Under the Articles of Confederation, there were no general federal courts or crimes. Although the Articles authorized a federal court to punish "piracies and felonies committed on the high seas," and the Congress of the Confederation in 1775 created the Court of Appeals in Prize Cases, Congress soon devolved this power to the states. Rather than creating additional crimes, the Congress merely recommended to the states that they criminalize acts like piracy and counterfeiting.

Criminal law was considered in the framing of the Constitution. In addition to the criminal procedure provisions of Article Three, the Constitutional Convention discussed piracy, crimes against the law of nations, treason, and counterfeiting. As Alexander Hamilton noted in Federalist No. 21, a "most palpable defect of the subsisting Confederation, is the total want of a sanction to its laws. The United States, as now composed, have no powers to exact obedience, or punish disobedience to their resolutions . . . ."

One of the first statutes passed by the First Congress, the Judiciary Act of 1789, divided original jurisdiction for the trial of federal crimes between the district courts and the circuit courts. The district courts were given jurisdiction over all federal crimes "where no other punishment than whipping, not exceeding thirty stripes, a fine not exceeding one hundred dollars, or a term of imprisonment not exceeding six months, is to be inflicted." The circuit courts were given concurrent jurisdiction over these crimes, and exclusive jurisdiction over all other federal crimes. The circuit courts also exercised appellate jurisdiction over the district courts, but only in civil cases. In capital cases, the Act provided that "the trial shall be had in the county where the offence, was committed, or where that cannot be done without great inconvenience, twelve petit jurors at least shall be summoned from thence." "No other procedural provisions were included, probably because the legislators were simultaneously considering amendments which would provide such security."

The Act of 1789 also placed the responsibility for prosecuting federal crimes in the United States Attorney for each federal judicial district. The Act provided that "there shall be appointed in each district" a "person learned in the law to act as attorney for the United States in such district, who shall be sworn or affirmed to the faithful execution of his office, whose duty it shall be to prosecute in such district all delinquents for crimes and offences, cognizable under the authority of the United States." The Act authorized judges, justices, justices of the peace, and magistrates to issue arrest warrants. The Act provided a right to bail in non-capital cases, and authorized bail in capital cases—by the district courts, circuit courts, and Supreme Court, or any individual judge of them—issued on an "exercise their discretion therein, regarding the nature and circumstances of the offence, and of the evidence, and the usages of law." The 1789 act did not create federal prisons, but it did provide for the imprisonment of federal prisoners (presumably in state prisons) "at the expense of the United States."

Many of the substantive federal crimes during this period were created by two omnibus pieces of legislation: the Crimes Act of 1790 (authored and introduced by Senator and future Chief Justice Oliver Ellsworth) and the Crimes Act of 1825 (authored by Justice Joseph Story and introduced by Representative Daniel Webster). Congress also passed a variety of single-subject criminal statutes, which were not centrally codified in any official publication.

Between 1790 and 1797, only 143 or 147 criminal cases were brought in the circuit courts, and 56 of those cases were brought in the Pennsylvania circuit court concerning the Whiskey Rebellion. And, between 1790 and 1801, only 426 criminal cases were brought in all federal courts (the district courts and the circuit courts combined). Between 1801 and 1828, a total of 2,718 criminal indictments were returned in the circuit courts: 596 resulted in guilty verdicts by juries; 479, not guilty verdicts by juries; 902, nolle prosequi; and 741, other (either no disposition recorded, abated, quashed, discharged, discontinued, or prison break).

Prior to Chief Justice Marshall's tenure, the Supreme Court had heard only two criminal cases—both by prerogative writ. First, in United States v. Hamilton (1795), the Court granted bail to a capital defendant charged with treason—as it was authorized to do by § 33 of the Judiciary Act of 1789 and § 4 of the Judiciary Act of 1793—on an original writ of habeas corpus. The greater portion of the decision was dedicated to the Court's refusal to order the case tried by a special circuit court, as was provided for by § 3 of the Judiciary Act of 1793. (Note: In Bollman, the Marshall Court explained, with reference to Hamilton, that the power to grant bail under § 33 could only have been exercised via original habeas under § 14. Ex parte Bollman, 8 U.S. (4 Cranch) 75, 100–01 (1807).) Second, in United States v. Lawrence (1795), the Court declined to issue a writ of mandamus to compel a district judge to order the arrest of a deserter of the French navy, as the French government argued to be required by the consular convention between the United States and France.

== Sources of jurisdiction ==
=== Writs of error ===
The Judiciary Act of 1789 authorized the Supreme Court to hear writs of error from the circuit courts and writs of error from the highest state courts in cases that involved the validity or construction of federal law. Either a judge of the lower court or a justice of the Supreme Court would have to sign the writ of error (which was drafted and signed by counsel) before the Supreme Court could hear the case. Signing the writ of error was not a mere formality, but rather a preliminary assessment of the merits of the arguments in the writ.

==== Circuit courts ====
Section 22 of the Judiciary Act of 1789 authorized writs of error from the circuit courts only in civil cases. The District of Columbia Organic Act of 1801—which created the United States Circuit Court of the District of Columbia and granted it jurisdiction over crimes committed within the federal district—did not explicitly limit writs of error from the D.C. circuit court to civil cases, except insofar as it required an amount in controversy. Although the Court reached the merits of a criminal writ of error from the D.C. circuit court in United States v. Simms (1803), without any discussion of the jurisdictional issue, in United States v. More (1805), the Court held that it had no such jurisdiction. More held that Congress's piecemeal statutory grants of appellate jurisdiction to the Court operated as an exercise of Congress's power under the Exceptions Clause, eliminating all jurisdiction not explicitly granted. (Note: The Exceptions Clause provides that "[i]n all [cases other than those in which the Supreme Court has original jurisdiction], the supreme Court shall have appellate Jurisdiction, both as to Law and Fact, with such Exceptions, and under such Regulations as the Congress shall make." U.S. Const. art. III, § 2, cl. 2.)

More also rejected the argument that criminal writs of error were authorized by § 14 of the Judiciary Act of 1789 (the "All Writs Act"). That section provided, in relevant part, that "all the before-mentioned courts of the United States shall have power to issue . . . all other writs, not specially provided for by statute, which may be necessary for the exercise of their respective jurisdictions, and agreeable to the principles and usages of law." Following More, the Court did not hear writs of error from federal criminal trials in the circuit courts for 84 years. In 1889, Congress created a right of appeal by writ of error in capital cases. The Judiciary Act of 1891 (the "Evarts Act") extended this right to serious crimes. And, the Judicial Code of 1911—which abolished the circuit courts and placed original jurisdiction for the trial of all federal crime in the district courts—granted general appellate jurisdiction.

==== State courts ====
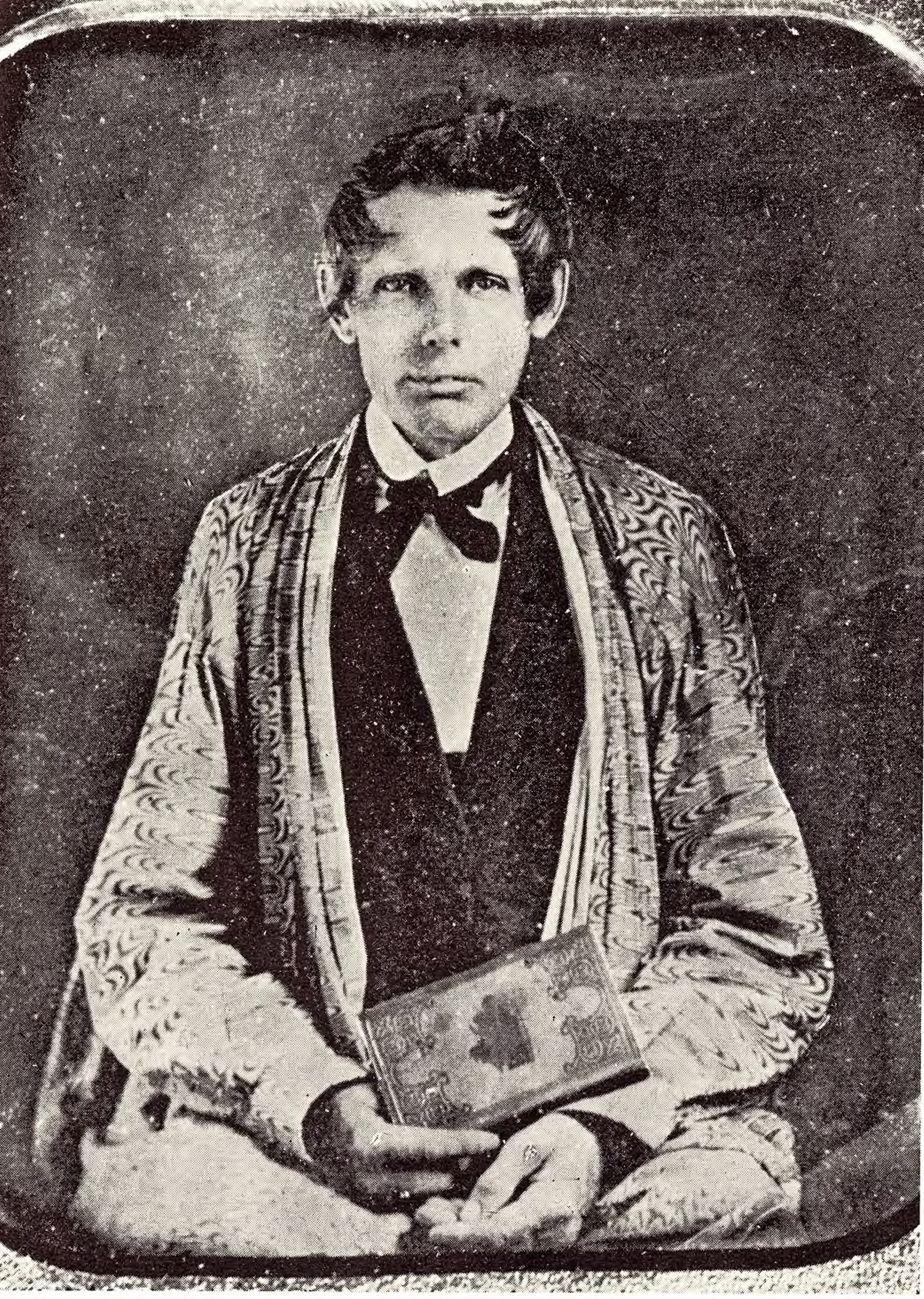
Samuel Worcester

Section 25 of the Judiciary Act of 1789 authorized the Supreme Court to hear writs of error from state courts in cases

where is drawn in question the validity of a treaty or statute of, or at, authority exercised under the United States, and the decision is against their validity; or where is drawn in question the validity of a statute of, or an authority exercised under any State, on the ground of their being repugnant to the constitution, treaties or laws of the United States, and the decision is in favour of such their validity, or where is drawn in question the construction of any clause of the constitution, or of a treaty, or statute of, or commission held under the United States, and the decision is against the title, right, privilege or exemption specially set up or claimed by either party, under such clause of the said Constitution. treaty, statute or commission . . . .

Only twice did the Marshall Court hear criminal cases under § 25. In Cohens v. Virginia (1821), the Court upheld a state lottery law conviction because the federal lottery was authorized only in the District of Columbia. In Worcester v. Georgia (1832), the Court reversed Worcester's conviction for being present in Cherokee country as inconsistent with federal law.

Section 25 was not a more significant source of criminal appeals in large part because—as Barron v. Baltimore (1833) held—the Bill of Rights (including its criminal procedure provisions) was viewed as inapplicable to the state governments. This continued until the incorporation of the Bill of Rights after the adoption of the Fourteenth Amendment.

=== Habeas corpus ===
Section 14 of the Judiciary Act of 1789 provided, in relevant part, that

all the before-mentioned courts of the United States shall have power to issue writs of . . . habeas corpus . . . . And that either of the justices of the supreme court . . . shall have the power to grant writs of habeas corpus for the purpose of an inquiry into the cause of commitment.—Provided, That writs of habeas corpus shall in no case extend to prisoners in gaol, unless where they are in custody, under or by colour of the authority of the United States, or are committed for trial before some court of the same, or are necessary to be brought into court to testify.

The Marshall Court heard six habeas cases of a criminal nature. All of the cases involved detention in the District of Columbia and prior proceedings in the United States Circuit Court of the District of Columbia. Because the D.C. circuit court did not utilize the practice of riding circuit, certificates of division could not have been granted in these cases. In the first two cases, the Court held that it had jurisdiction to issue the writ in pre-conviction situations. In the next two cases, the Court held that it did not have jurisdiction to issue the writ in post-conviction cases.

Ex parte Burford

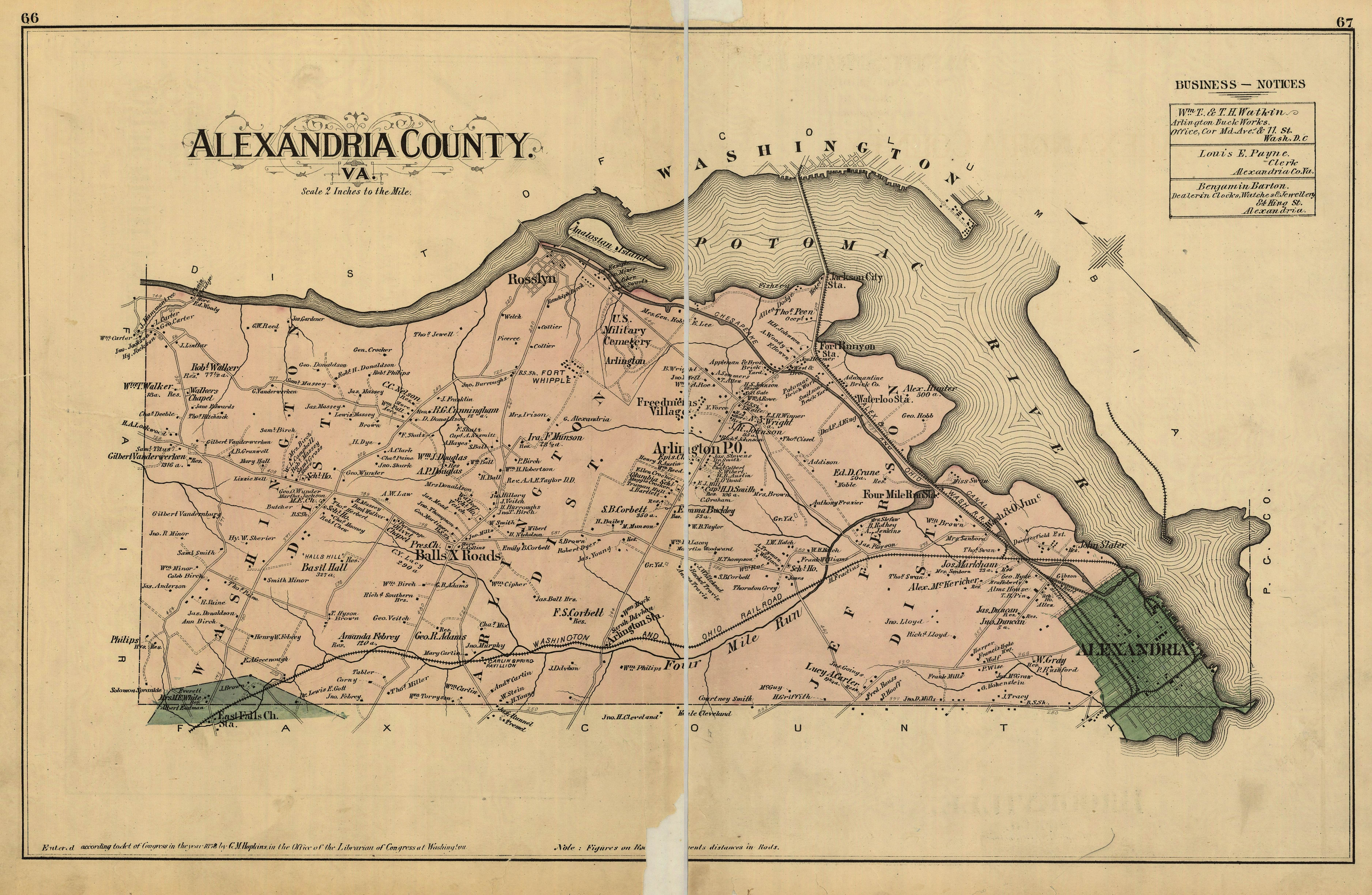
Burford concerned imprisonment of an "evil doer" in Alexandria County, D.C.

In Ex parte Burford (1806), the Court granted the writ of habeas corpus in a case of preventative detention. Eleven justices of the peace of Alexandria County, D.C. had issued a warrant for Burford's arrest on the grounds that he was "not of good name and fame, nor of honest conversation, but an evil doer and disturber of the peace of the United States, so that murder, homicide, strifes, discords, and other grievances and damages, amongst the citizens of the United States, concerning their bodies and property, are likely to arise thereby." (Note: D.C. justices of the peace, also created by the Organic Act, were appointed by the President for five-year terms with jurisdiction over "all matters, civil and criminal, and in whatever relates to the conservation of the peace" within their county. District of Columbia Organic Act of 1801, § 11, 2 Stat. 103, 107.) The D.C. circuit court initially granted Burford the writ of habeas corpus, but remanded him until he posted $1,000 bail.

The Court held that the "warrant of commitment was illegal, for want of stating some good cause certain, supported by oath." In his dissent in Bollman, Johnson indicated that he also wished to have dissented in Burford:

In the case of Burford I was one of the members who constituted the court. I owe it to my own consistency to declare that the court were then apprized of my objections to the issuing of the writ of habeas corpus. I did not then comment at large on the reasons which influenced my opinion, and the cause was this: The gentleman who argued that cause confined himself strictly to those considerations which ought alone to influence the decisions of this court. No popular observations on the necessity of protecting the citizen from executive oppression, no animated address calculated to enlist the passions or prejudices of an audience in defence of his motion, imposed on me the necessity of vindicating my opinion. I submitted in silent deference to the decision of my brethren.

Ex parte Bollman

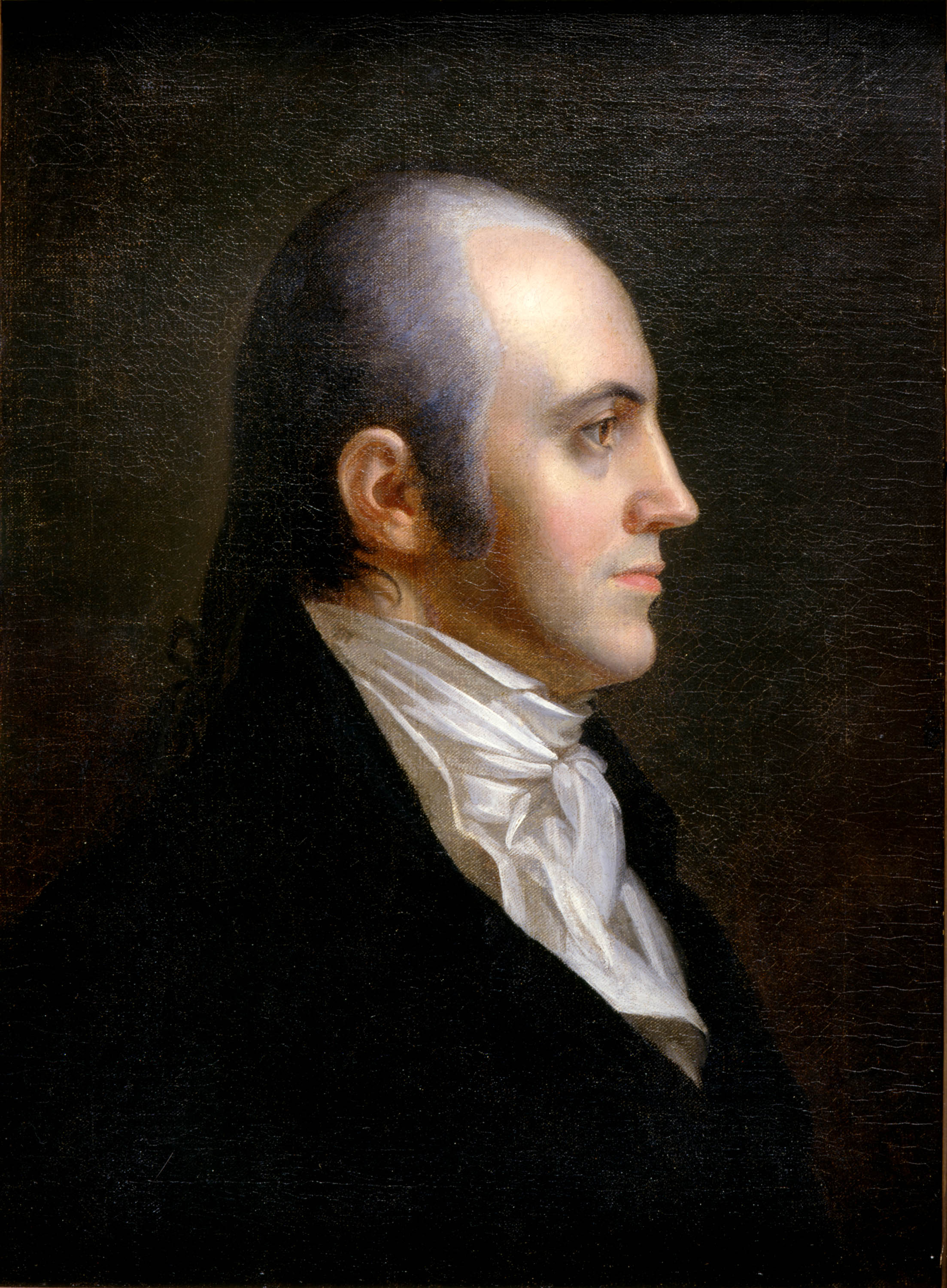
Ex parte Bollman granted the writ to two members of the Burr conspiracy (Aaron Burr pictured).

In Ex parte Bollman (1807), the Court granted the writ to two members of the Burr conspiracy. Dr. Erick Bollman and Samuel Swartwout, having been apprehended in New Orleans, were transported to Charleston and then Baltimore on a navy vessel—notwithstanding the writs of habeas corpus issued by a territorial judge in New Orleans and a district judge in Charlestown. The United States Circuit Court of the District of Columbia issued an arrest warrant for Bollman and Swartwout (who were already in military custody), slated the case for trial in D.C., and denied the prisoners bail; Judge William Cranch (also the Supreme Court's reporter of decisions) dissented in part on the ground that there was no probable cause for the arrest warrant as required by the Fourth Amendment. The Senate passed, but the House rejected, legislation that would have suspended the writ for three months and legalized Bollman and Swartwout's arrests. Nearly every member of Congress attended the oral arguments in the Supreme Court.

Chief Justice Marshall's two opinions for the Court in Bollman addressed several issues. On February 13, Marshall held that the Supreme Court had jurisdiction to issue the writ under Article Three and § 14. First, he held that the restrictive phrase "necessary for the exercise of their respective jurisdictions" applied only to "all other writs, not specially provided for by statute," not habeas corpus. Next, he held that the proviso applies both to the power of courts and individual justices to issue the writ, and that the scope of the writ was to be determined by reference to common law. Then, he held that original habeas was not preempted by the decision of a lower court to deny bail. Finally, he reaffirmed the holding of Burford that original habeas was a constitutional exercise of appellate jurisdiction.

Justice Johnson dissented. Johnson stated that his dissent was "supported by the opinion of one of my brethren, who is prevented by indisposition from attending." Scholars are divided on whether Johnson referred to Justice Chase or Justice Cushing.

Prof. Freedman has argued that Bollman erred in applying § 14's proviso to both courts and individual judges (as opposed to only individual judges) and thus that the Judiciary Act of 1789 did confer federal courts the power to grant writs of habeas corpus to state prisoners. The Reconstruction-era Congress granted federal courts this power in 1867.

Ex parte Kearney

In Ex parte Kearney (1822), the Court denied the writ to a prisoner who was imprisoned for criminal contempt. In an opinion by Justice Story, the Court's reasoning reached far further:

[T]his Court has no appellate jurisdiction confided to it in criminal cases, by the laws of the United States. It cannot entertain a writ of error, to revise the judgment of the Circuit Court, in any case where a party has been convicted of a public offence. And undoubtedly the denial of this authority proceeded upon great principles of public policy and convenience. If every party had a right to bring before this Court every case, in which judgment had passed against him, for a crime or misdemeanor or felony, the course of justice might be materially delayed and obstructed, and, in some cases, totally frustrated. If, then, this Court cannot directly revise a judgment of the Circuit Court in a criminal case, what reason is there to suppose, that it was intended to vest it with the authority to do it indirectly?

Story explained:

The only objection is, not that the Court acted beyond its jurisdiction, but that it erred in its judgment of the law applicable to the case. If, then, we are to give any relief in this case, it is by a revision of the opinion of the Court, given in the course of a criminal trial, and thus asserting a right to control its proceedings, and take from them the conclusive effect which the law intended to give them. If this were an application for a habeas corpus, after judgment on an indictment for an offence within the jurisdiction of the Circuit Court, it could hardly be maintained, that this court could revise such a judgment, or the proceedings which led to it, or set it aside, and discharge the prisoner.

Ex parte Watkins

In Ex parte Watkins (1830), the Court held that the writ did not lie after a federal criminal conviction even if the indictment failed to state an offense. Three years later, with the same petitioner, in Ex parte Watkins (1833), the Court did issue the writ because the petitioner was detained beyond his authorized sentence for non-payment of a fine; although the Court held that such detention would be permissible under the writ of capias pro fine (generally, a writ ordering the imprisonment of a defendant until a criminal fine is paid), it held that it was not under the writ of capias ad satisfaciendum (a civil law analog). After further proceedings in the D.C. circuit court, Tobias Watkins was discharged.

Ex parte Milburn

In Ex parte Milburn (1835), the Court denied an original habeas petition concerning pretrial detention holding that the forfeiture of bail for failure to appear did not satisfy a criminal indictment and that a prior granting of the writ of habeas corpus was no bar to a subsequent arrest warrant.

=== Certificates of division ===
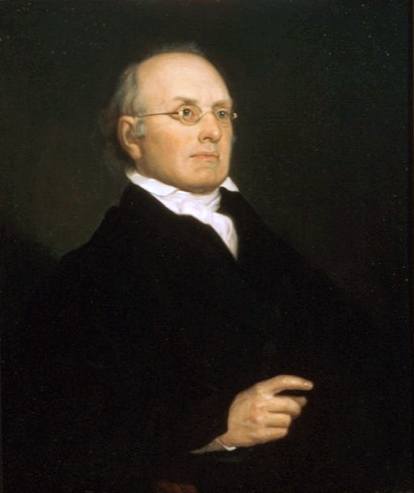
Justice Joseph Story wrote than an appeal in criminal cases would result in "manifest obstruction of public justice."

Under the Judiciary Act of 1789, the United States circuit courts were composed of a stationary United States district court judge and any two Supreme Court justices riding circuit. If one judge or justice disagreed with the other two, the majority prevailed. If only one Supreme Court justice could attend (as was authorized by the Judiciary Act of 1793), (Note: Section 4 of the Judiciary Act of 1789 had provided that two judges or justices would constitute a quorum, and the practice of sending a single circuit rider was already common before 1793. Erwin C. Surrency, A History of Federal Courts, 28 Mo. L. Rev. 214, 219 (1963).) and a division arose between the district judge and the Supreme Court justice, the practice was to hold the case over until the next term. If a one-to-one division persisted with a different circuit riding justice, the opinion of the previous circuit rider broke the tie. Following a brief intermezzo with the soon-repealed Midnight Judges Act of 1801 (which briefly abolished circuit riding), under the Judiciary Act of 1802, the circuit courts were composed of a stationary district judge and one Supreme Court justice assigned to the circuit. (Note: The justices were to divide the circuits among themselves by agreement; failing that, the President was to assign the justice to circuits. Judiciary Act of 1802, § 5, 2 Stat. 156, 158.) But, a single judge (either the district judge or the circuit rider) could preside alone. In cases where both judges sat, though, one-to-one divisions were less likely to be resolved by continuing the case until the next term because the circuit riding justice would be the same (barring a change in membership on the Court).

Accordingly, § 6 of the Judiciary Act of 1802 provided that the circuit courts could certify questions of law to the Supreme Court if the judges were divided on that question. Several scholars have argued that certificates of division were pro forma, and that the judge and justice would merely agree to disagree, often without writing opposing opinions. For example, with the circuit court decision leading up to United States v. Marchant (1827), the reporter records that "[t]he district judge concurred in this opinion; but as it was a matter of not infrequent occurrence, and important to the practice of the court, the judges afterwards divided in opinion for the purpose of obtaining a solemn decision of the superior court." Similarly, the United States v. Ortega (1826) circuit court opinion notes that the "point was taken to the supreme court upon a proforma certificate of a division of opinion in this court."

Chief Justice Marshall and Justice Story in particular were known for making use of certificates of division while riding circuit. For example, Justice Marshall was one of the divided judges in United States v. Klintock (1820), United States v. Smith (1820), United States v. Amedy (1826), United States v. Turner (1833), and United States v. Mills (1833); and Justice Story played the role in United States v. Coolidge (1816), United States v. Bevans'' (1818), United States v. Palmer (1818), United States v. Holmes'' (1820), and Marchant. But, Justice Story—in his opinions for the Court—cautioned against the too frequent use of certificates of division in criminal cases. In United States v. Gooding (1827), for the Court, Justice Story wrote:

We take this opportunity of expressing our anxiety, least, by too great indulgence to the wishes of counsel, questions of this sort should be frequently brought before this Court, and thus, in effect, an appeal in criminal cases become an ordinary proceeding to the manifest obstruction of public justice, and against the plain intendment of the acts of Congress.

The Judiciary Act of 1802 plainly did contemplate that certificates of division would issue in criminal cases. Section 6 provided that "imprisonment shall not be allowed, nor punishment in any case be inflicted, where judges of the said court are divided in opinion upon the question touching the said imprisonment or punishment." And, while the statute provided only for the certification of "the point upon which the disagreement shall happen," the justices sometimes took the liberty of enlarging the question. For example, in United States v. Hudson (1812), the question certified was "whether the Circuit Court of the United States had a common law jurisdiction in cases of libel?" but the question answered was "whether the Circuit Courts of the United States can exercise a common law jurisdiction in criminal cases?" And, in United States v. Bevans (1818), the Court noted that "[i]t may be deemed within the scope of the question certified to this court" to inquire whether the murder was cognizable under § 3 of the Crimes Act of 1790, even though the defendant had only been indicted under § 8.

But not every question or every case was eligible for a certificate of division. In United States v. Daniel (1821), the Court held that a motion for a new trial—as authorized by the § 17 of the Judiciary Act of 1789—could not be the subject of a certificate of division; rather, the division would operate a rejection of the motion. Similarly, in United States v. Bailey (1835), the Court held that the question of whether the evidence was legally sufficient to support the offense charged could not be certified. And, certificates of division began to fall into disuse as it became increasingly common for the circuit courts to sit with a single judge. As Chief Justice Marshall wrote, he did not have "the privilege of dividing the court when alone."

== Defining federal crimes ==
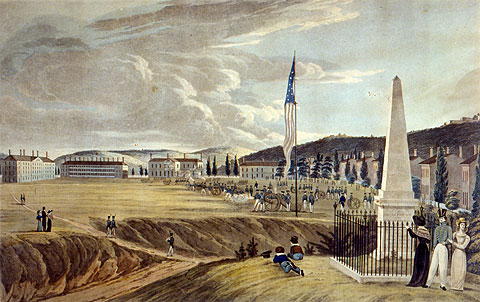
The Supreme Court's first assimilative crimes case involved a burglary at West Point (depicted circa 1828).

=== Assimilative crimes ===
Section 3 of the Crimes Act of 1825 enacted the first federal assimilative crimes statute, criminalizing conduct in violation of state law within areas under federal jurisdiction. Section 3 provided that:

[I]f any offence shall be committed in any [fort, dock-yard, navy-yard, arsenal, armory, magazine, lighthouse, or other needful building under the jurisdiction of the United States], the punishment of which offence is not specifically provided for by any law of the United States, such offense shall, upon conviction in any court of the United States having cognisance thereof, be liable to, and receive the same punishment as the laws of the state in which such [place aforesaid], is situated, provide for the like offence when committed within the body of any county of such state.

In United States v. Paul (1832)—involving a criminal burglary at West Point, prosecuted via an 1829 New York statute defining burglary in the third degree—the Court held that the assimilative crimes provision was limited to state crimes in force at the time of the federal statute's enactment. The 1866, 1874, 1898, 1909, 1933, 1935, and 1940 re-enactments of the assimilative crimes offense explicitly incorporated this interpretation of Paul.

But, in 1948, Congress amended the Assimilative Crimes Act, 18 U.S.C. § 13, to incorporate changes in state criminal law, as they occur, up until the commission of the charged conduct. The Supreme Court upheld the constitutionality of the revision in United States v. Sharpnack (1958). Sharpnack held that: "There is nothing in [Paul] to show that the issue was decided as anything more than one of statutory construction falling within the doctrine calling for the narrow construction of a penal statute. So interpreted, the decision did not reach the issue that is before us."

=== Common law crimes ===
Barzillai Hudson and George Goodwin were indicted for common law libel after their newspaper accused Congress, at President Jefferson's request, of appropriating $2M to bribe Napoleon.

In United States v. Hudson (1812), without oral argument from either the defendants or Attorney General William Pinkney, the Court held that an indictment for a common law crime must be dismissed because all federal crimes (with the exception of contempt of court) must be established by statute. Justice Johnson, for the Court, wrote:

Although this question is brought up now for the first time to be decided by this Court, we consider it as having been long since settled in public opinion. In no other case for many years has this jurisdiction been asserted, and the general acquiescence of legal men shows the prevalence of opinion in favor of the negative of the proposition.

While riding circuit in Massachusetts, Justice Story—in addition to distinguishing Hudson under admiralty jurisdiction—argued for the overruling of Hudson:

[Hudson] having been made without argument, and by a majority only of the court, I hope that it is not an improper course to bring the subject again in review for a more solemn decision, as it is not a question of mere ordinary import, but vitally affects the jurisdiction of the courts of the United States; a jurisdiction which they cannot lawfully enlarge or diminish. I shall submit, with the utmost cheerfulness, to the judgment of my brethren, and if I have hazarded a rash opinion, I have the consolation to know, that their superior learning and ability will save the public from an injury by my error.

On the certificate of division, in United States v. Coolidge (1816), three justices—Washington and Livingston in addition to Story—indicated their willingness to depart from Hudson, but since no counsel appeared for Coolidge, and since Attorney General Richard Rush refused to argue the point, Hudson was reaffirmed.

According to Prof. Rowe, "[f]ew major controversies have ended with as slight a whimper as the battle over federal common law crimes that raged in the first two decades of the American republic." Rowe argues that "without acknowledging it, the Hudson Court disapproved at least eight circuit court cases, brushed off the views of all but one Justice who sat on the Court prior to 1804, and departed from what was arguably the original understanding of those who framed the Constitution and penned the Judiciary Act of 1789." Rowe views Hudson as a codification of an issue decided by public opinion, including during the 1800 presidential election: "Hudson set onto tablets the principles that guided the Jeffersonians during their wanderings in the desert."

=== Counterfeiting ===
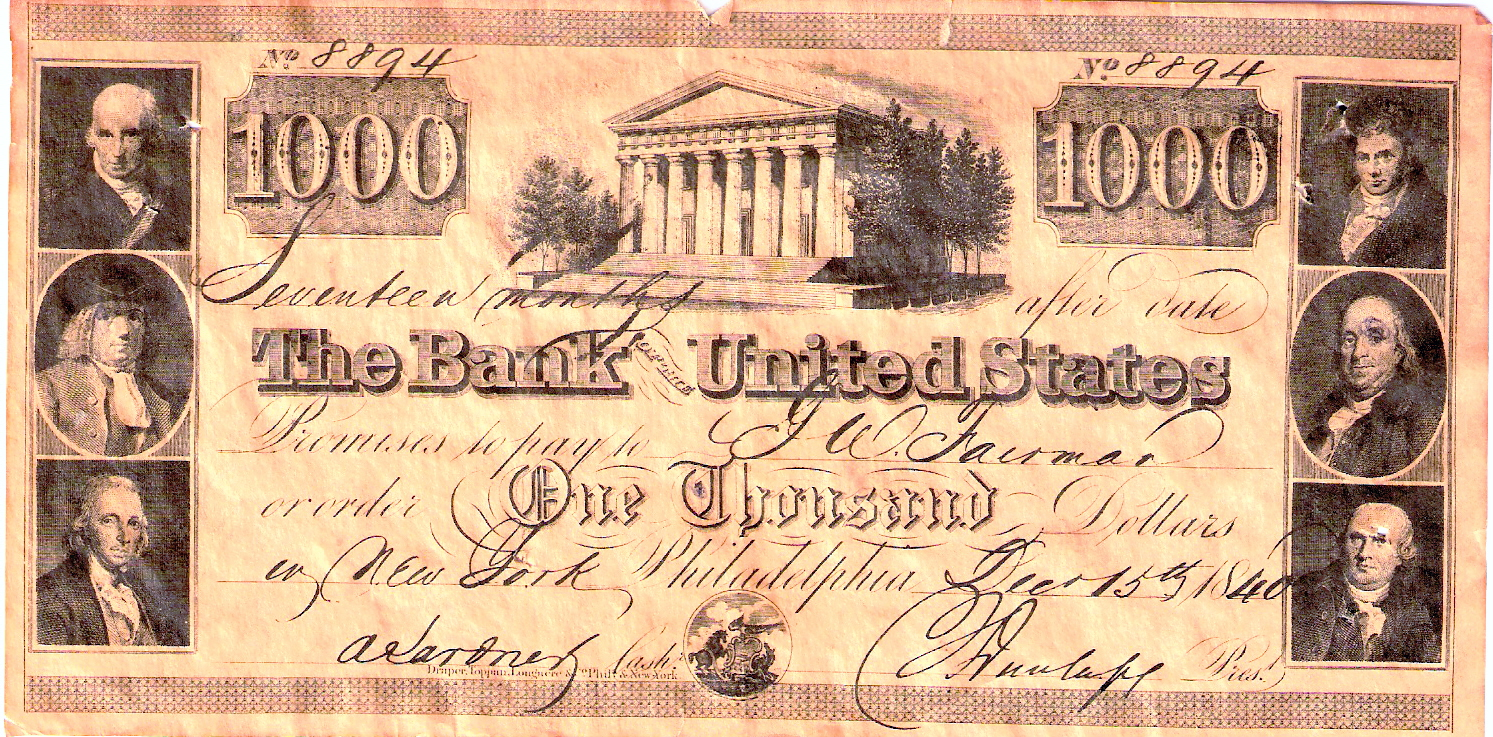
The Court held that it was not a crime to counterfeit promissory notes (pictured)—as distinguished from bills—issued by the Second Bank of the United States.

First Bank

When it created the First Bank of the United States, Congress criminalized counterfeiting the bills of the bank. "Read literally," the statute required both that the bill be counterfeit and that the bill be signed by the President of the Bank of the United States. In United States v. Cantril (1807), without oral argument, the Court arrested a judgment of conviction under the counterfeiting statute, finding the statute invalid "for the reasons assigned in the record" (without further elaboration). By the time Cantril was decided, Congress had already passed a new statute to correct the apparent drafting error.

According to Prof. Whittington, Cantril was the first challenge to a federal statute under the Due Process Clause of the Fifth Amendment to be considered by the Court. In later cases, the Court has noted the several possible holdings that could have been intended in Cantril.

Second Bank

Congress passed a new counterfeiting statute in 1816 when it created the Second Bank of the United States. In United States v. Turner (1833), interpreting the new act, the Court held that the offense of counterfeiting was committed even if the signatures forged were those of the wrong bank officers. But, in United States v. Brewster (1833), the Court held that the crime applied only to counterfeit bills, not counterfeit notes.

=== Embargos ===
War of 1812

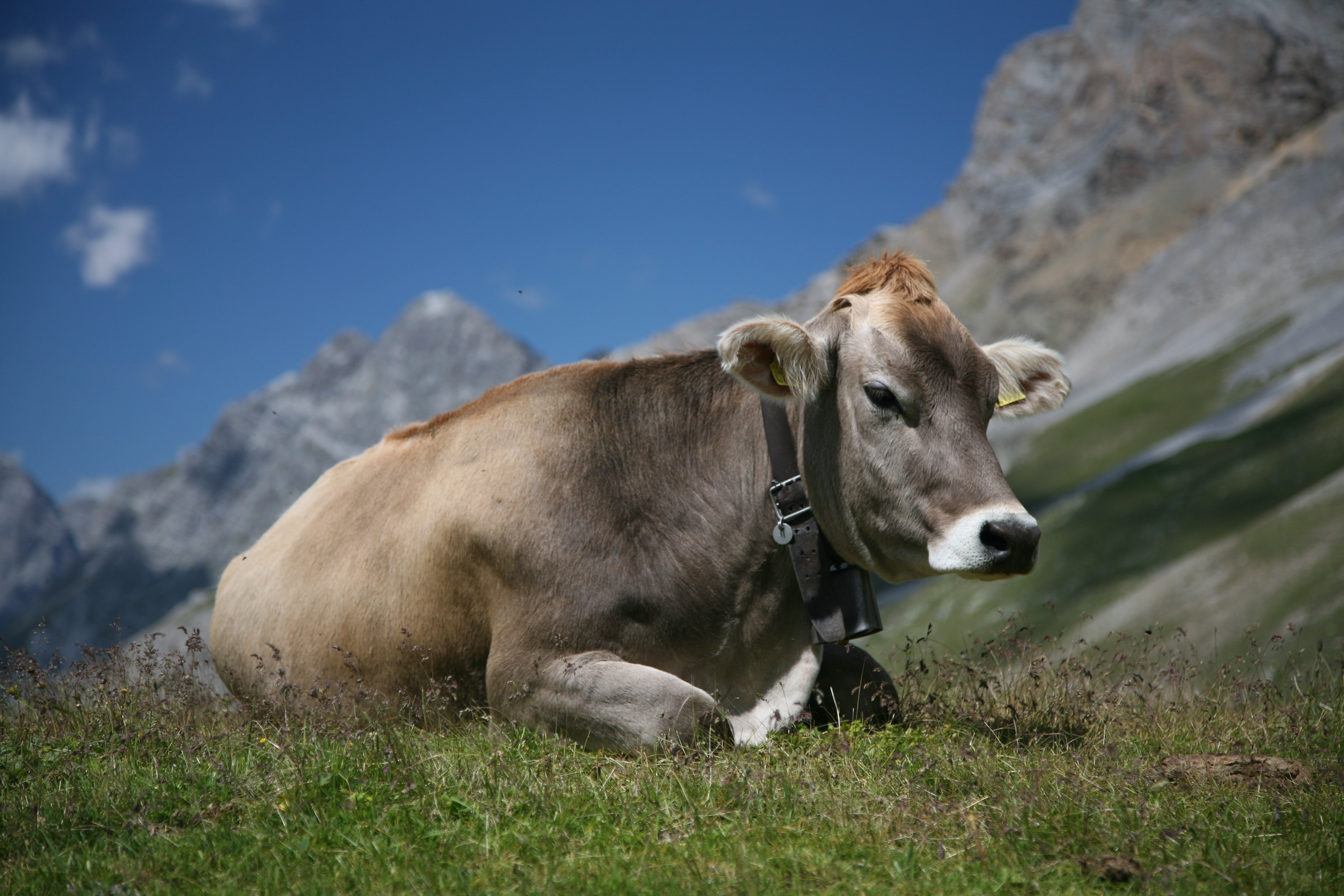
The Court held that cattle were a provision or munition of war.

In June 1812, during the War of 1812, Congress passed a statute prohibiting the transportation "over land or otherwise, in any wagon, cart, sleigh, boat, or otherwise, naval or military stores, arms or the munitions of war, or any article of provision, from any place of the United States, to" Canada. In United States v. Barber (1815), the Court held "fat cattle" to be "provisions, or munitions of war, within the true intent and meaning of the act." In United States v. Sheldon (1817), decided after the war had ended, Barber was distinguished on the grounds that driving cattle on foot was not "transportation" within the meaning of the act.

Neutrality Act of 1818

The Neutrality Act of 1818 provided the arming of a vessel with the intention that it be employed against a people at peace with the United States. In United States v. Quincy (1832), the Court decided several questions concerning the interpretation of the Neutrality Act. First, the Court held that the elements of the offense did not require that the vessel be fitted out within the United States, but rather than an intention to fit the vessel out in an intermediary port was sufficient. Second, the Court held that a conditional intention (for example, an intention to so arm the vessel only if sufficient funds could be obtained) was insufficient to satisfy the elements of the offense. Third, the Court held that, if the defendant had a fixed intention to so arm the vessel upon leaving the United States, the frustration of that intention at the intermediate port was irrelevant. Fourth, the Court refused to distinguish between the statutory term of "people" and the concept of a "state."

=== False statements ===
United States v. Bailey (1835) upheld an indictment for false swearing relating to a claim against the United States (as provided for by an 1823 statute) even though the officer administering the oath had been a state justice of the peace. Justice McLean dissented.

=== Maritime insurance fraud ===
An 1804 criminal insurance fraud statute provided:

[I]f any person shall, on the high seas, wilfully and corruptly cast away, burn, or otherwise destroy, any ship or vessel of which he is owner in part or in whole, or in anywise direct or procure the same to be done, with intent or design to prejudice any person or persons that hath underwritten, or shall underwrite, any policy or policies of insurance thereon or of any merchant or merchants that shall load goods thereon, or of any other owner or owners of such ship or vessel, the person or persons offending therein, being thereof lawfully convicted, shall be deemed and adjudged guilty of felony, and shall suffer death.

In United States v. Amedy (1826), the Court held that the federal criminal insurance fraud statute was no subjected to the same formalities as civil insurance fraud claims. First, the Court held that the state statute of incorporation of the insurance company required no more than the state's seal to be authenticated. Second, there was no need to prove the existence of the insurance company (i.e., that its stock had actually been subscribed) because it was not a party. Nor was it necessary to prove that the policy would have been binding against the insurance company. Nor did it matter whether the policy would have paid out under the circumstances of the fraud. Finally, it was held that an insurance corporation was a person within the meaning of the statute.

=== Piracy and the high seas ===
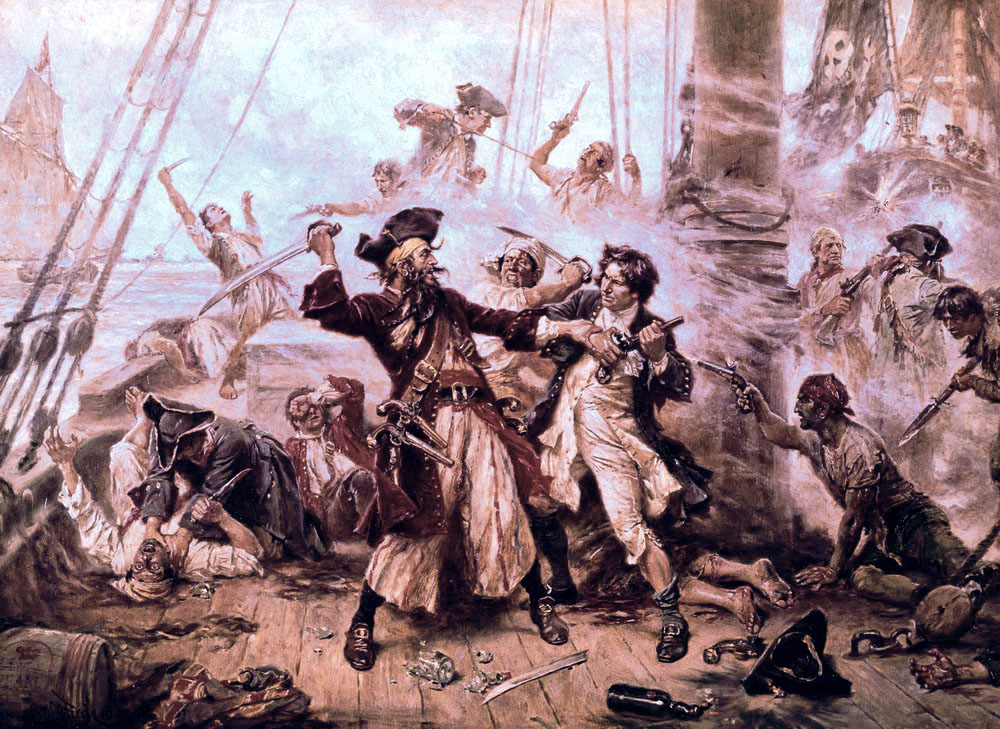
The Marshall Court decided many controversial piracy cases (the death of Blackbeard depicted).

The piracy cases considered by the Marshall Court arose under two Congressional statutes: the Crimes Act of 1790 and the Act of March 3, 1819. Article One provides that Congress shall have the power "[t]o define and punish Piracies and Felonies committed on the high Seas." Five sections in the Crimes Act "were devoted to the subject," but "[t]he principal provisions with respect to piracy were incorporated in section 8." According to Prof. White, "from 1815 to 1823, piracy cases were among the most numerous and controversial of those decided by the Court."

Crimes Act of 1790, § 8

Section 8 of the Crimes Act of 1790 provided:

[I]f any person or persons shall commit upon the high seas, or in any river, haven, basin or bay, out of the jurisdiction of any particular state, murder or robbery, or any other offence which if committed within the body of a county, would by thelaws of the United States be punishable with death; or if any captain or mariner of any ship or other vessel, shall piratically and feloniously run away with such ship or vessel, or any goods or merchandise to the value of fifty dollars, or yield up such ship or vessel voluntarily to any pirate; or if any seaman shall lay violent hands upon his commander, thereby to hinder and prevent his fighting in defence of his ship or goods committed to his trust, or shall make a revolt in the ship; every such offender shall be deemed, taken and adjudged to be a pirate and felon, and being thereof convicted, shall suffer death; and the trial of crimes committed on the high seas, or in any place out of the jurisdiction of any particular state, shall be in the district where the offender is apprehended, or into which he may first be brought.

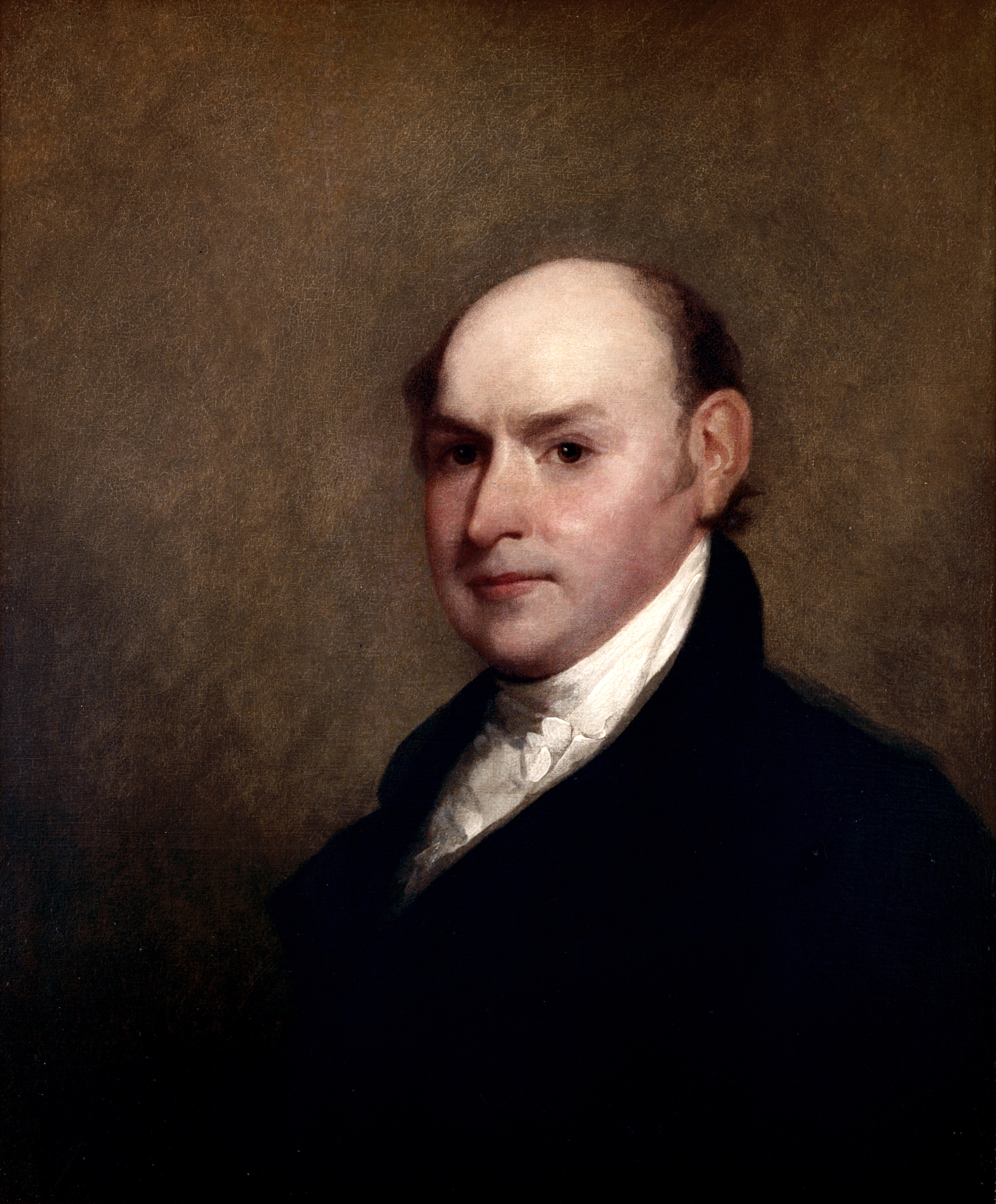
President John Quincy Adams called United States v. Palmer "a sample of judicial logic—disingenuous, false, and hollow."

The first two decisions to interpret § 8 construed it not to apply to the crimes charged. In United States v. Bevans (1818), the Court held that the § 8 of the Act did not extend to a murder committed on a navy vessel within state waters. (Note: Article One provides that Congress shall have the power "[t]o define and punish Piracies and Felonies committed on the high Seas, and Offenses against the Law of Nations." U.S. Const. art. I, § 8, cl. 10. Article Three provides that "[t]he judicial Power shall extend . . . to all Cases of admiralty and maritime Jurisdiction." U.S. Const. art. III, § 2, cl. 1.) In United States v. Palmer (1818), the Court held that the § 8 of the Act did not extend to piracy by U.S. citizen defendants, in the employ of a South American government at war with Spain, committed against Spanish ships and citizens. President John Quincy Adams was a harsh critic of the decision in Palmer. He wrote in his diary that the Court had "cast away the jurisdiction which a law of congress had given, that its "reasoning [was] a sample of judicial logic—disingenuous, false, and hollow," and that it gave him "an early disgust for the practice of law, and led me to the unalterable determination never to accept judicial office."

Following the Act of 1819, in 1820 the Court began to distinguish Palmer. In United States v. Klintock (1820), the Court distinguished Palmer—in a case involving piracy by a U.S. citizen, claiming to act under the authority of the Mexican Republic, committed against a Danish ship and citizens, under the fraudulent claim that the Danes were Spanish (Spain being at war with the Mexican Republic)—on the grounds that the victims in Palmer were not subjects of a nation recognized by the United States. In United States v. Furlong (1820), sometimes referred to as United States v. Pirates, authored by Justice Johnson (a dissenter in Palmer), the Court distinguished Palmer again, primarily on the ground that the pirate vessel had no nationality (it was an American ship prior to being hijacked). United States v. Holmes (1820) distinguished Palmer on the same ground, further holding that the burden was on the defendant to prove that his vessel flew a lawful flag.

Crimes Act of 1790, § 12

Section 12 of the Act provided:

[I]f any seaman or other person shall commit manslaughter upon the high seas, or confederate, or attempt or endeavour to corrupt any commander, master, officer or mariner, to yield up or to run away with any ship or vessel, or with any goods, wares, or merchandise, or to turn pirate, or to go over to or confederate with pirates, or in any wise trade with any pirate knowing him to be such, or shall furnish such pirate with any ammunition, stores or provisions of any kind, or shall fit out any vessel knowingly and with a design to trade with or suppJy or correspond with any pirate or robber upon the seas; or if any person or persons shall any ways consult, combine, confederate or correspond with any pirate or robber on the seas, knowing him to be guilty of any such piracy or robbery; or if any seaman shall confine the master of any ship or other vessel, or endeavour to make a revolt in such ship . . . such person or persons so offending, and being thereof convicted, shall be imprisoned not exceeding three years, and fined not exceeding one thousand dollars.

In United States v. Wiltberger (1820), the Court held that § 12 of the Act did not extend to a manslaughter committed "in a river such as the river Tigris" because such was not on the "high seas." (Justice Washington had delivered an unrelated jury charge below.) In United States v. Kelly (1826), the Court interpreted the phrase "endeavour to make a revolt" to refer to "the endeavour of the crew of a vessel, or any one or more of them, to overthrow the legitimate authority of her commander, with intent to remove him from his command, or against his will to take possession of the vessel by assuming the government and navigation of her, or by transferring their obedience from the lawful commander to some other person." Justice Washington, the author of the opinion of the Court, had written a slightly longer opinion below.

Act of March 3, 1819, § 5

In 1819, Congress enacted a new anti-piracy statute: Act to Protect the Commerce of the United States and Punish the Crime of Piracy. Section 5 of that Act provided:

[I]f any person or persons whatsoever, shall, on the high seas, commit the crime of piracy, as defined by the law of nations, and such offender or offenders shall afterwards be brought into, or found in, the United States, every such offender or offenders shall, upon conviction thereof, before the Circuit Court of the United States for the District into which he or they may be brought, or in which he or they shall be found, be punished with death.

In United States v. Smith (1820), in an opinion by Justice Story, the Court upheld a conviction under the 1819 statute, holding that Congress could leave the definition of piracy to the law of nations. After reviewing the history of foreign (primarily English) law, Justice Story declared: "We have, therefore, no hesitation in declaring, that piracy, by the law of nations, is robbery upon the sea, and that it is sufficiently and constitutionally defined by the fifth section of the act of 1819." In a rare dissent, Justice Livingston argued that Article One, Section Eight, Clause Ten obliged Congress to define piracy with more specificity. The facts in Smith were almost identical to those which Palmer had held could not be reached under the Crimes Act of 1790: a U.S. citizen pirate, commissioned by a government in Buenos Aires, had led a mutiny, seized a new ship, and then robbed a Spanish ship.

Section 5 of the 1819 act was set to sunset at the end of the next session of Congress. Before that time, Congress made the provision permanent in an 1820 omnibus piracy bill that also defined additional offenses. Section 8 of the Crimes Act of 1790, § 5 of the 1819 act, and § 3 of the 1820 act were all separately codified in the Revised Statutes in 1874. Section 8 of the Crimes Act of 1790 was repealed by the Criminal Code of 1909.

=== Slave trading ===
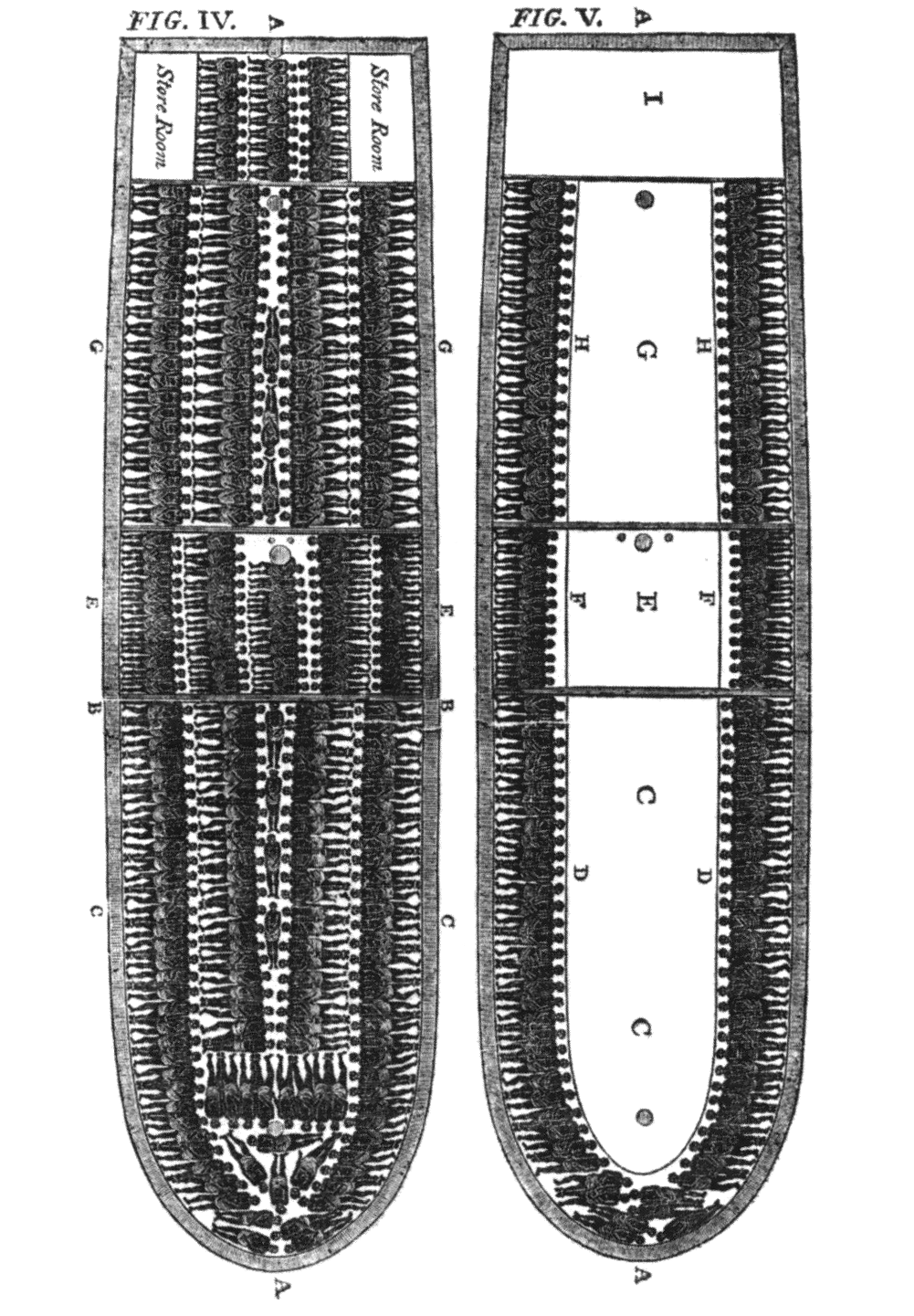
A diagram of a slave ship used in the Atlantic slave trade

The Slave Trade Act of 1818 prohibited the importation of slaves into the United States. The "fitting out" offense provided that:

[N]o citizen or citizens of the United States, or any other person or persons, shall, after the passing of this act, as aforesaid, for himself, themselves, or any other person or persons whatsoever, either as master, factor, or owner, build, fit, equip, load, or otherwise prepare, any ship or vessel, in any port or place within the jurisdiction of the United States, nor cause any such ship or vessel to sail from any port or place whatscever, within the jurisdiction of the same, for the purpose of procuring any negro, mulatto, or person of colour, from any foreign kingdom, place, or country, to be transported to any port or place whatsoever, to be held, sold, or otherwise disposed of, as slaves, or to be held to service or labour; and if any ship or vessel shall be so built, fitted out, equipped, laden, or otherwise prepared, for the purpose aforesaid, every such ship or vessel, her tackle, apparel, furniture, and lading, shall be forfeited, one moiety to the use of the United States, and the other to the use of the person, or persons who shall sue for said forfeiture, and prosecute the same to effect; and such ship or vessel shall be liable to be seized, prosecuted, and condemned, in any court of the United States having competent jurisdiction.

and that:

[E]very person or persons so building, fitting out, equipping, loading, or otherwise preparing, or sending away, or causing any of the acts aforesaid to be done, with intent to employ such ship or vessel in such trade or business, after the passing of this act, contrary to the true intent and meaning thereof or who shall, in any wise, be aiding or abetting therein, shall, severally, on conviction thereof, by due course of law, forfeit and pay a sum not exceeding five thousand dollars, nor less than one thousand dollars, one moiety to the use of the United States, and the other to the use of the person or persons who shall sue for such forfeiture and prosecute the same to effect, and shall moreover be imprisoned for a term not exceeding seven years, nor less than three years.

In United States v. Gooding (1827), the Court construed the elements of the fitting out offense. First, the Court held that the offense of fitting out a vessel for slave trading could be committed even if the owner of the vessel did not personally fit it out. Second, the Court held that the statute could be violated by a partial fitting out (as opposed to a complete fitting out) of a vessel for that purpose. Third, the Court held that—since slave trading was a misdemeanor—there was no distinction between principal and accessory. Fourth, the Court held that, for the statute to be violated, the fitting out must have occurred within the United States. Finally, the Court held that the statute's mens rea required that the owner intend to cause the vessel to be used for slave trading, as opposed to intending that the vessel be used for slave trading (by some third party).

=== Treason ===
Article Three, Section Three, Clause One of the Constitution provides that:

Treason against the United States, shall consist only in levying War against them, or in adhering to their Enemies, giving them Aid and Comfort. No Person shall be convicted of Treason unless on the Testimony of two Witnesses to the same overt Act, or on Confession in open Court.

Section 1 of the Crimes Act of 1790 provided that

if any person or persons, owing allegiance to the United States of America, shall levy war against them, or shall adhere to their enemies, giving them aid and comfort within the United States or elsewhere, and shall be thereof convicted, on confession in open court, or on the testimony of two witnesses to the same overt act of treason whereof he or they shall stand indicted, such person or persons shall be adjudged guilty of treason against the United States, and shall suffer death.

In Ex parte Bollman (1807), the Court held that conspiracy to wage war on the United States was not treason. Further, Bollman held that the evidence against both Bollman and Swartwout was insufficient to justify pre-trial detention.

== Criminal procedure ==
=== Constitutional issues ===
Venue

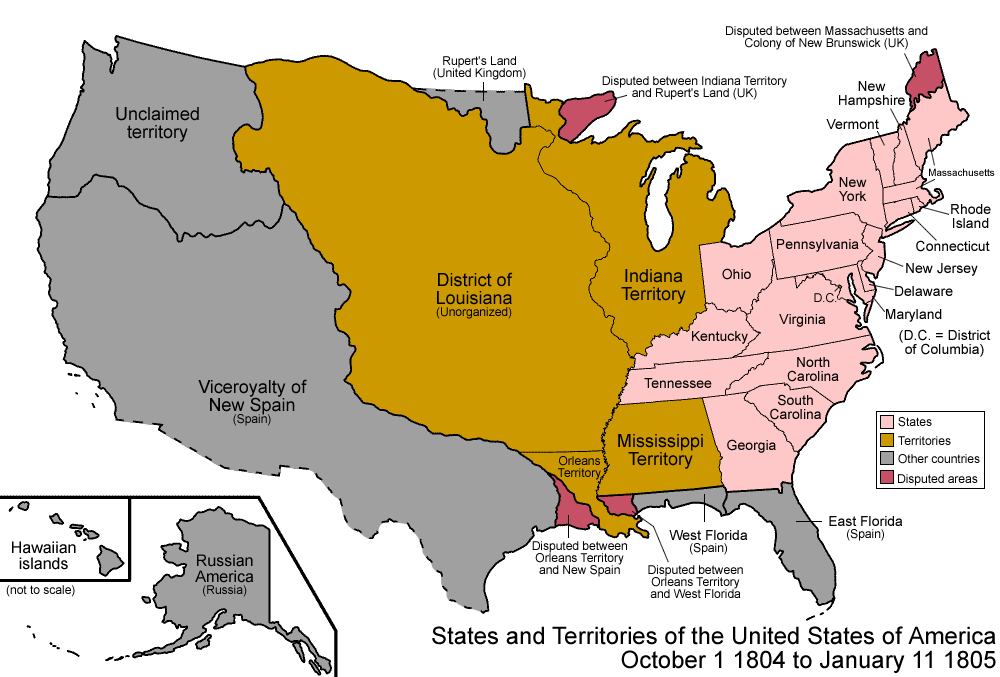
Bollman held that the venue provision of the Crimes Act of 1790 for crimes committed in "any place out of the jurisdiction of any particular state" did not apply to crimes committed in the Territory of Orleans.

While Ex parte Bollman (1807) is more famous for its holding that the Burr conspirators had not committed treason, the Court could not have ordered the release of the prisoners without also addressing the Neutrality Act of 1794, (Note: Section 5 of the Neutrality Act of 1794 provided that "if any person shall within the territory or jurisdiction of the United States begin or set on foot or provide or prepare the means for any military expedition or enterprise to be carried on from thence against the territory or dominions of any foreign prince or state with whom the United States are at peace, every such person so offending shall upon conviction be adjudged guilty of a high misdemeanor, and shall suffer fine and imprisonment at the discretion of the court in which the conviction shall be had, so as that such fine shall not exceed three thousand dollars nor the term of imprisonment be more than three years." 1 Stat. 381, 384.) under which the conspirators were also charged. With regard to these charges, the Court conceded, "those who admit the affidavit of General Wilkinson cannot doubt."

But, Bollman held that venue for the Neutrality Act charges was improper in the District of Columbia. (Note: Article Three, Section Two, Clause Three of the Constitution provided that: "The Trial of all Crimes . . . shall be held in the State where the said Crimes shall have been committed; but when not committed within any State, the Trial shall be at such Place or Places as the Congress may by Law have directed." U.S. Const. art. III, § 2, cl. 3. Section 8 of the Crimes Act of 1790 directed that "the trial of crimes committed on the high seas, or in any place out of the jurisdiction of any particular state, shall be in the district where the offender is apprehended, or into which he may first be brought. Crimes Act of 1790, § 8, 1 Stat. 112, 114.) First, the Court rejected locus delicti venue (without reaching the question of whether such could exist outside of a U.S. state). "[T]hat no part of this crime was committed in the district of Columbia is apparent. It is therefore the unanimous opinion of the court that they cannot be tried in this district." Second, the Court rejected statutory venue under section 8 the Crimes Act of 1790 (as permitted by Article Three for crimes not committed within a state). The Court held that the Territory of Orleans was not a place that triggered the alternative venue provisions of the Crimes Act. The Court held that the statutory term "any place out of the jurisdiction of any particular state" applied only to "any river, haven, bason or bay, not within the jurisdiction of any particular state," and only in "those cases there is no court which has particular cognizance of the crime."

Double jeopardy

In three opinions, the Marshall Court considered questions of double jeopardy, without ever clearly referring to the Double Jeopardy Clause of the Fifth Amendment. First, in United States v. Perez (1824), the Court held that there was no bar to a second prosecution after a mistrial was declared for "manifest necessity." (Justice Story authored the opinion of the Court, espousing the position taken by Justice Thompson below.) Next, in United States v. Wilson (1833), the Court held that the protection of prior jeopardy extended to lesser included offenses; "[a]fter the judgment [of conviction], no subsequent prosecution could be maintained for the same offence, nor for any part of it." But, Wilson held that, in order to receive the protection of a pardon, a defendant must accept the pardon and affirmatively plead its existence in court. And, finally, in United States v. Randenbush (1834)—where the defendant had first been acquitted of counterfeiting one note, and then convicted of counterfeiting a different note (which had been introduced as evidence at the first trial)—the Court held that double jeopardy did not run from the use of the same evidence for "entirely a distinct offence."

Original jurisdiction of the Supreme Court

In United States v. Ortega (1826), the Court held that it was not unconstitutional to vest original jurisdiction for the criminal trial of assaults on ambassadors in the circuit courts. The Court did not reach the question of whether the original jurisdiction of the Supreme Court could be made concurrent with a lower court, (Note: "In all Cases affecting Ambassadors, other public Ministers and Consuls, and those in which a State shall be Party, the supreme Court shall have original Jurisdiction." U.S. Const. art. III, § 2, cl. 2. In Ames v. Kansas ex rel. Johnston, 111 U.S. 449, 462–72 (1884), the Court held that lower federal courts could be given concurrent jurisdiction over cases within the Supreme Court's original jurisdiction.) instead holding that the criminal trial of an assault on an ambassador (Note: "[I]f any person shall violate any safe conduct or passport duly obtained and issued under the authority of the United States, or shall assault, strike, wound, imprison, or in any other manner infract the law of nations, by offering violence to the person of an ambassador or other public minister, such person so offending, on conviction, shall be imprisoned not exceeding three years, and fined at the discretion of the court." Crimes Act of 1790, § 28, 1 Stat. 112, 118. The Ortega syllabus incorrectly cited the provision as § 37, which does not exist. 24 U.S. at 467.) was not a "Case[] affecting Ambassadors, other public Ministers and Consuls" within the meaning of Article Three. Justice Washington, the author of the Court's opinion, had also delivered the jury charge below.

Two Supreme Court justices had previously disagreed on this question while riding circuit. In United States v. Ravara (C.C.D. Pa. 1793), an indictment for sending anonymous and threatening letters to a foreign minister with a view to extort money, Justice James Wilson argued that the circuit court could be given concurrent jurisdiction; Justice James Iredell argued that it could not; Judge Richard Peters, of the District of Pennsylvania, sided with Wilson, and the case continued.

=== Evidence ===
Burden of proof

In United States v. Gooding (1827), the Court held that the government must bear the burden of proof in criminal cases "unless a different provision is made by some statute."

Hearsay

Also in Gooding, the Court approved of a hearsay exception for the statement of an agent of the defendant, holding that the doctrine should be the same in civil and criminal cases.

Best evidence

In United States v. Reyburn (1832), the Court again held that civil rules of evidence should be applied in criminal cases, recognizing an exception to the best evidence rule where "non production of the written instrument is satisfactorily accounted for."

=== Other ===
Facts found by a jury

In United States v. Tyler (1812), without oral argument, the Court held that an error in a verdict sheet—referring to the goods in violation of the embargo as "pot-ashes" rather than "pearl-ashes"—was harmless because the jury need not find the value to be forfeited.

Sufficiency of an indictment

In United States v. Gooding (1827), the Court held that, in general, it is sufficient for a criminal indictment to merely repeat the text of the statute. Further, the Court held that—"under circumstances of an extraordinary nature," "on very urgent occasions"—a challenge to the sufficiency of an indictment could be made post-conviction. In United States v. Mills (1833), the Court again embraced the general rule that a sufficient indictment need only follow the terms of the statute.

Separate trials of co-defendants

In United States v. Marchant (1827), the Court held that—even though a trial court has the discretion to sever the trials of co-defendants—a defendant has no right to insist upon being tried alone. The Court recounted the history of criminal severance in English law, and concluded that the practice merely arose to prevent co-defendants from each using their peremptory challenges to deplete the venire such that too few jurors remained for trial. Justice Story was the author of the opinion of the Court, as well as a substantially similar opinion in the Massachusetts circuit court below.

Nol pros

In United States v. Phillips (1832), the Court dismissed a criminal action, on the motion of the Attorney General, pursuant to the district prosecutor's filing of a nolle prosequi motion (a motion by the prosecutor to dismiss the case) in the trial court, even though the nolle prosequi motion was filed after the writ of error issued from the Supreme Court. Phillips has been cited as an early example of judicial recognition of the norm of prosecutorial enforcement discretion and as an example of mootness (although the Phillips Court did not use that term). The underlying case had involved the prosecution of Zalegman Phillips, a prominent Philadelphia attorney, for interfering with diplomatic immunity, as protected by the Crimes Act of 1790, by filing a lawsuit against a former diplomat. The question certified was whether the provision extended to former diplomats.
