= List of certificates of division in criminal cases =

A certificate of division, a procedure for appellate review created by § 6 of the Judiciary Act of 1802, authorized the Supreme Court of the United States to hear questions of law certified from the United States circuit courts if the United States district court judge and the Supreme Court justice riding circuit were divided on that question. Between 1802 and 1896, certificates of division were the source of jurisdiction for approximately half of the criminal cases heard by the Supreme Court.

== List ==
=== Marshall Court ===
- United States v. Cantril, 8 U.S. (4 Cranch) 167 (1807)
- United States v. Hudson, 11 U.S. (7 Cranch) 32 (1812)
- United States v. Tyler, 11 U.S. (7 Cranch) 285 (1812)
- United States v. Barber, 13 U.S. (9 Cranch) 243 (1815) (per curiam)
- United States v. Coolidge, 14 U.S. (1 Wheat.) 415 (1816)
- United States v. Sheldon, 15 U.S. (2 Wheat.) 119 (1817)
- United States v. Bevans, 16 U.S. (3 Wheat.) 336 (1818)
- United States v. Palmer, 16 U.S. (3 Wheat.) 610 (1818)
- United States v. Wiltberger, 18 U.S. (5 Wheat.) 76 (1820)
- United States v. Klintock, 18 U.S. (5 Wheat.) 144 (1820)
- United States v. Smith, 18 U.S. (5 Wheat.) 153 (1820)
- United States v. Furlong, 18 U.S. (5 Wheat.) 184 (1820)
- United States v. Holmes, 18 U.S. (5 Wheat.) 412 (1820)
- United States v. Daniel, 19 U.S. (6 Wheat.) 542 (1821)
- United States v. Perez, 22 U.S. (9 Wheat.) 579 (1824)
- United States v. Amedy, 24 U.S. (11 Wheat.) 392 (1826)
- United States v. Kelly, 24 U.S. (11 Wheat.) 417 (1826)
- United States v. Ortega, 24 U.S. (11 Wheat.) 467 (1826)
- United States v. Marchant, 25 U.S. (12 Wheat.) 480 (1827)
- United States v. Gooding, 25 U.S. (12 Wheat.) 460 (1827)
- United States v. Paul, 31 U.S. (6 Pet.) 141 (1832)
- United States v. Reyburn, 31 U.S. (6 Pet.) 352 (1832)
- United States v. Quincy, 31 U.S. (6 Pet.) 445 (1832)
- United States v. Phillips, 31 U.S. (6 Pet.) 776 (1832)
- United States v. Turner, 32 U.S. (7 Pet.) 132 (1833)
- United States v. Brewster, 32 U.S. (7 Pet.) 164 (1833) (per curiam)
- United States v. Wilson, 32 U.S. (7 Pet.) 150 (1833)
- United States v. Mills, 32 U.S. (7 Pet.) 138 (1833)
- United States v. Randenbush, 33 U.S. (8 Pet.) 288 (1834)

=== Taney Court ===
- United States v. Coombs, 37 U.S. (12 Pet.) 72 (1838)
- United States v. Hardyman, 38 U.S. (13 Pet.) 176 (1839)
- United States v. Morris, 39 U.S. (14 Pet.) 464 (1840)
- United States v. Wood, 39 U.S. (14 Pet.) 430 (1840)
- United States v. Murphy, 41 U.S. (16 Pet.) 203 (1842)
- United States v. Rogers, 45 U.S. (4 How.) 567 (1846)
- United States v. Briggs (Briggs I), 46 U.S. (5 How.) 208 (1847)
- United States v. Staats, 49 U.S. (8 How.) 41 (1850)
- United States v. Briggs (Briggs II), 50 U.S. (9 How.) 351 (1850)
- United States v. Marigold, 50 US (9 How.) 560 (1850)
- United States v. Reid, 53 U.S. (12 How.) 361 (1851)
- United States v. Dawson, 56 U.S. (15 How.) 467 (1853)
- United States v. Nickerson, 58 U.S. (17 How.) 204 (1854)
- United States v. Shackleford, 59 U.S. (18 How.) 588 (1855)
- United States v. Jackalow, 66 U.S. (1 Black) 484 (1861)

=== Chase Court ===
- United States v. Murphy, 70 U.S. (3 Wall.) 649 (1865)
- United States v. Holliday, 70 U.S. (3 Wall.) 407 (1865)
- United States v. Scott, 70 U.S. (3 Wall.) 642 (1865)
- Ex parte Milligan, 71 U.S. (4 Wall.) 2 (1866)
- License Tax Cases, 72 U.S. (5 Wall.) 462 (1866)
- United States v. Mayrand, 154 U.S. 552 (1867)
- United States v. Hartwell, 73 U.S. (6 Wall.) 385 (1867)
- United States v. Cook, 154 U.S. 555 (1868)
- United States v. Rosenburgh, 74 U.S. (7 Wall.) 580 (1868)
- United States v. Kirby, 74 U.S. (7 Wall.) 482 (1868)
- United States v. Dewitt, 76 U.S. (9 Wall.) 41 (1869)
- United States v. Tynen, 78 U.S. (11 Wall.) 88 (1870)
- United States v. Howell, 78 U.S. (11 Wall.) 432 (1870)
- United States v. Avery, 80 U.S. (13 Wall.) 251 (1871)
- United States v. Cook, 84 U.S. (17 Wall.) 168 (1872)
- United States v. Buzzo, 85 U.S. (18 Wall.) 125 (1873)
- United States v. Arwo, 86 U.S. (19 Wall.) 486 (1873)

=== Waite Court ===
- United States v. Norton, 91 U.S. (1 Otto) 566 (1875)
- United States v. Cruikshank, 92 U.S. (2 Otto) 542 (1875)
- United States v. Reese, 92 U.S. (2 Otto) 214 (1875)
- United States v. Fox, 95 U.S. (5 Otto) 670 (1877)
- United States v. Van Auken, 96 U.S. (6 Otto) 366 (1877)
- United States v. Simmons, 96 U.S. (6 Otto) 360 (1877)
- United States v. Hall, 98 U.S. (8 Otto) 343 (1878)
- United States v. Irvine, 98 U.S. (8 Otto) 450 (1878)
- United States v. Benecke, 98 U.S. (8 Otto) 447 (1878)
- United States v. Germaine, 99 U.S. (9 Otto) 508 (1878)
- United States v. Hirsch, 100 U.S. (10 Otto) 33 (1879)
- Trade-Mark Cases, 100 U.S. (10 Otto) 82 (1879)
- Tennessee v. Davis, 100 U.S. (10 Otto) 257 (1879)
- United States ex rel. Phillips v. Gaines, 1880 WL 18566 (U.S. 1880)
- United States v. Carll, 105 U.S. (15 Otto) 611 (1881)
- United States v. McBratney, 104 U.S. (14 Otto) 621 (1881)
- United States v. Britton, 108 U.S. 207 (1883)
- United States v. Harris, 106 U.S. (16 Otto) 629 (1883)
- United States v. Britton, 107 U.S. (17 Otto) 655 (1883)
- United States v. Curtis, 107 U.S. (17 Otto) 671 (1883)
- United States v. Britton, 108 U.S. 192 (1883)
- United States v. Britton, 108 U.S. 193 (1883)
- United States v. Britton, 108 U.S. 199 (1883)
- United States v. Ambrose, 108 U.S. 336 (1883)
- Ex parte Tom Tong, 108 U.S. 556 (1883)
- United States v. Hamilton, 109 U.S. 63 (1883)
- United States v. Gale, 109 U.S. 65 (1883)
- United States v. Waddell, 112 U.S. 76 (1884)
- United States v. Petit, 114 U.S. 429 (1885)
- United States v. Spiegel, 116 U.S. 270 (1886)
- Mackin v. United States, 117 U.S. 348 (1886)
- United States v. Kagama, 118 U.S. 375 (1886)
- United States v. Rauscher, 119 U.S. 407 (1886)
- United States v. Northway, 120 U.S. 327 (1887)
- United States v. Arjona, 120 U.S. 479 (1887)
- Parkinson v. United States, 121 U.S. 281 (1887)
- United States v. Hess, 124 U.S. 483 (1888)
- United States v. Smith, 124 U.S. 525 (1888)

=== Fuller Court ===
- United States v. Reisinger, 128 U.S. 398 (1888)
- United States v. Pile, 130 U.S. 280 (1889)
- United States v. Hall, 131 U.S. 50 (1889)
- United States v. Perrin, 131 U.S. 55 (1889)
- United States v. Reilly, 131 U.S. 58 (1889)
- United States v. Lacher, 134 U.S. 624 (1890)
- United States v. Chase, 135 U.S. 255 (1890)
- Jones v. United States, 137 U.S. 202 (1890)
- United States v. Brewer, 139 U.S. 278 (1891)
- United States v. Eaton, 144 U.S. 677 (1892)
- United States v. Rodgers, 150 U.S. 249 (1893)
- United States v. Thomas, 151 U.S. 577 (1894)
- United States v. Rider, 163 U.S. 132 (1896)
- United States v. Hewecker, 164 U.S. 46 (1896)
