= Crimes Act of 1790 =

US bill

- Long title: An Act for the Punishment of Certain Crimes Against the United States
- Announced in: the 1st United States Congress

Legislative history
- Signed into law by President George Washington on April 30, 1790

Senator (and future Chief Justice) Oliver Ellsworth was the drafter of the Crimes Act.

The Crimes Act of 1790 (or the Federal Criminal Code of 1790), formally titled An Act for the Punishment of Certain Crimes Against the United States, defined some of the first federal crimes in the United States and expanded on the criminal procedure provisions of the Judiciary Act of 1789. The Crimes Act was a "comprehensive statute defining an impressive variety of federal crimes".

As an enactment of the First Congress, the Crimes Act is often regarded as a quasi-constitutional text. The punishment of treason, piracy, counterfeiting, as well as crimes committed on the high seas or against the law of nations, followed from relatively explicit constitutional authority. The creation of crimes within areas under exclusive federal jurisdiction followed from the plenary power of Congress over the "Seat of the Government", federal enclaves, and federal territories. The creation of crimes involving the integrity of the judicial process derived from Congress's authority to establish such courts.

The Crimes Act also established a statute of limitations for federal crimes, provided for criminal venue, ensured procedural protections for treason and capital defendants, simplified the pleading requirements for perjury, and provided protections broader than those in the Constitution against corruption of blood. Further, the act provided for punitive dissection of murderers and codified diplomatic immunity.

== Background ==
Even after the passage of the Judiciary Act of 1789, "the definition of crimes and the establishment of punishments" remained a "missing link of the criminal system". The Judiciary Act of 1789 divided original jurisdiction for the trial of federal crimes between the district courts and the circuit courts. The district courts were given jurisdiction over all federal crimes "where no other punishment than whipping, not exceeding thirty stripes, a fine not exceeding one hundred dollars, or a term of imprisonment not exceeding six months, is to be inflicted". The circuit courts were given concurrent jurisdiction over these crimes, and exclusive jurisdiction over all other federal crimes. The circuit courts also exercised appellate jurisdiction over the district courts, but only in civil cases.

The Judiciary Act of 1789 also placed the responsibility for prosecuting federal crimes in the United States Attorney for each federal judicial district. The act provided that "there shall be appointed in each district" a "person learned in the law to act as attorney for the United States in such district, who shall be sworn or affirmed to the faithful execution of his office, whose duty it shall be to prosecute in such district all delinquents for crimes and offences, cognizable under the authority of the United States."

Prior to the Crimes Act, Congress had established very few federal crimes. Among Congress's earlier criminal statutes were:

- The renewal of the Northwest Ordinance, which authorized the executive to adopt state law within the Northwest Territory; and
- A prohibition on unloading ships in the dark or without a license, as well as customs bribery and false statements; and
- A prohibition on census takers failing to report their findings.

== Drafting ==
The Senate passed an act to define a variety of federal crimes on August 31, 1789, but the House did not act on that bill.

Like the Judiciary Act of 1789 and the Process Act of 1789, the Crimes Act was primarily authored by Senator (and future Chief Justice) Oliver Ellsworth as the chair of the Senate committee. The committee examined the state criminal laws of Massachusetts, New Jersey, Pennsylvania, Virginia, and South Carolina at the beginning of the drafting process. The Crimes Act generated "little reported debate" on the floor of Congress. The act was passed on April 30, 1790.

== Crimes established ==
Due to the seriousness of the authorized sentences, under the Judiciary Act of 1789, original jurisdiction for the trial of all of the crimes created by the Crimes Act would have rested with the circuit courts; none of the crimes created could have been tried in the district courts.

=== Treason ===
Article Three provides that: "Treason against the United States, shall consist only in levying War against them, or in adhering to their Enemies, giving them Aid and Comfort. No Person shall be convicted of Treason unless on the Testimony of two Witnesses to the same overt Act, or on Confession in open Court. The Congress shall have power to declare the Punishment of Treason, but no Attainder of Treason shall work Corruption of Blood, or Forfeiture except during the Life of the Person attainted."

As to misprision of treason, according to David P. Currie, because "[t]he Constitution said nothing of this offense", "the legislators must have interpreted the narrow definition of treason in Article III not to preclude it from creating lesser related offenses that might otherwise fall within federal purview—although nothing in the misprision provision suggested that Congress had yet considered the possible impact of the Treason Clause on its efforts to punish seditious expression."

Section	Common offense name	Text	Authorized sentence	Supreme Court cases
1	Treason	[I]f any person or persons, owing allegiance to the United States of America, shall levy war against them, or shall adhere to their enemies, giving them aid and comfort within the United States or elsewhere, and shall be thereof convicted, on confession in open court, or on the testimony of two witnesses to the same overt act of treason whereof he or they shall stand indicted, such person or persons shall be adjudged guilty of treason against the United States, and shall suffer death.	Death	United States v. Hamilton, 3 U.S. (3 Dall.) 17 (1795); Ex parte Bollman, 8 U.S. (4 Cranch) 75 (1807)
2	Misprision of treason	[I]f any person or persons, having knowledge of the commission of any of the treasons aforesaid, shall conceal, and not, as soon as may be, disclose and make known the same to the president of the United States, or some one of the judges thereof, or to the president or governor of a particular state, or some one of the judges or justices thereof, such person or persons, on conviction, shall be adjudged guilty of misprision of treason, and shall be imprisoned not exceeding seven years, and fined not exceeding one thousand dollars.	7 years and $1000	None

=== Piracy and the high seas ===
Article One provides that Congress shall have the power "[t]o define and punish Piracies and Felonies committed on the high Seas". Five sections in the Crimes Act "were devoted to the subject". Currie notes that the various piracy offenses "take an exceedingly broad view of what constituted piracy", but that "[f]rom a constitutional standpoint no harm was done, since all of the acts punished were felonious and Congress's power extended to all felonies on the high seas."

"The principal provisions with respect to piracy were incorporated in section 8." Section 8 applied not only to the "high Seas", but also to "any river, haven, basin, or bay, out of the jurisdiction of any particular State". Currie notes a variety of constitutional theories which Congress might have espoused in order to justify this provision: "Whether Congress thought authority over such places included within the ostensibly narrower term 'high Seas', necessary and proper to the regulation of commerce or to the exercise of admiralty jurisdiction, or implicit in a central government responsible for external affairs is not clear."

Currie also argues that the phrase "offence, which, if committed within the body of a county, would, by laws of the United States, be punishable with death" is vague. He suggests that it could refer to any federal law, to any state or federal law, or only to federal laws applicable to places under exclusive federal jurisdiction.

Section	Common offense name	Text	Authorized sentence	Supreme Court cases
8	Murder, robbery, or felony on the high seas; piracy and mutiny	[I]f any person or persons shall commit, upon the high seas, or in any river, haven, basin, or bay, out of the jurisdiction of any particular State, murder or robbery, or any other offence, which, if committed within the body of a county, would, by laws of the United States, be punishable with death; or, if any captain or mariner of any ship or other vessel, shall piratically and feloniously run away with such ship or vessel, or any goods or merchandize, to the value of fifty dollars, or yield up such ship or vessel voluntarily to any pirate; or if any seaman shall lay violent hands upon his commander, thereby to hinder and prevent his fighting in defence of his ship, or goods committed to his trust, or shall make a revolt in the ship; every such offender shall be deemed, taken, and adjudged to be, a pirate and felon, and being thereof convicted, shall suffer death ...	Death	United States v. Bevans, 16 U.S. (3 Wheat.) 336 (1818); United States v. Palmer, 16 U.S. (3 Wheat.) 610 (1818); United States v. Klintock, 18 U.S. (5 Wheat.) 144 (1820); United States v. Furlong, 18 U.S. (5 Wheat.) 184 (1820); United States v. Holmes, 18 U.S. (5 Wheat.) 412 (1820)
9	Piracy, robbery, hostility against the United States	[I]f any citizen shall commit any piracy or robbery, aforesaid, or any act of hostility against the United States, or any citizen thereof, upon the high seas, under colour of any commission from any foreign prince or State, or on pretence of authority from any person, such offnder shall, notwithstanding the pretence of authority, be deemed, adjudged, and taken to be, a pirate, felon, and robber, and on being thereof convicted, shall suffer death.	Death	None
10	Accomplice to murder, robbery, or piracy	[E]very person who shall either upon the land or seas, knowingly and wittingly aid and assist, procure, command, counsel or advise, any person or persons to do or commit any murder or robbery, or other piracy aforesaid, upon the high seas, which shall affect the life of such person, and such person or persons shall thereupon do or commit any such piracy or robbery, then all and every such person, so as aforesaid aiding, assisting, procuring, commanding, counselling, or advising the same, either upon the land or the sea, shall be, and they are hereby declared, deemed, and adjudged to be, accessary to such piracies before the fact, and every such person, being thereof convicted, shall suffer death.	Death	None
11	Accessory after the fact to murder, felony, robbery, or piracy	[A]fter any murder, felony, robbery, or other piracy whatsoever, aforesaid, is or shall be committed by any pirate or robber, every person who, knowing that such pirate or robber has done or committed any such piracy or robbery, shall, on the land or at sea, receive, entertain, or conceal, any such pirate or robber, or receive or take into his custody any ship, vessel, goods, or chattels, which have been, by any such pirate or robber, piratically and feloniously taken, shall be, and are hereby declared, deemed and adjudged, to be accessary to such piracy or robbery, after the fact; and on conviction thereof, shall be imprisoned, not exceeding three years, and fined, not exceeding five hundred dollars.	3 years and $500	None
12	Manslaughter or accomplice to piracy	[I]f any seaman or other person shall commit manslaughter upon the high seas, or confederate, or attempt or endeavour to corrupt any commander, master, officer or mariner, to yield up or to run away with any ship or vessel, or with any goods, wares, or merchandize, or to turn pirate, or to go over to or confederate with pirates, or in any wise trade with any pirate, knowing him to be such, or shall furnish such pirate with any ammunition, stores, or provisions, of any kind; or shall fit out any vessel, knowingly, and with a design, to trade with or supply or correspond with any pirate or robber upon the seas; or if any persons shall any ways consult, combine, confederate, or correspond, with any pirate or robber on the seas, knowing him to be guilty of any such piracy or robbery; or if any seaman shall confine the master of any ship or other vessel, or endeavour to make revolt in such ship; such person or person, so offending, and being thereof convicted, shall be imprisoned, not exceedings three years, and fined, not exceeding one thousand dollars.	3 years and $1000	United States v. Wiltberger, 18 U.S. (5 Wheat.) 76 (1820); United States v. Kelly, 24 U.S. (11 Wheat.) 417 (1826)

=== Counterfeiting ===
Article One provides that Congress shall have the power "[t]o provide for the Punishment of counterfeiting the Securities and current Coin of the United States." Currie argues that section 14's somewhat broad reading of the word "Securities" is fair enough. Currie suggests that "[n]othing was said of counterfeiting coins" because the United States Mint had not yet been established.

Some members of the House, including Theodore Sedgwick of Massachusetts, spoke against the prescribing death penalty for counterfeiting, viewing it as too harsh.

Section	Common offense name	Text	Authorized sentence	Supreme Court cases
14	Counterfeiting	If any person or persons shall falsely make, alter, forge or counterfeit, or cause or procure to be falsely made, altered, forged, or counterfeited, or willingly act or assist in the false making, altering, forging or counterfeiting any certificate, indent, or other public security of the United States, or shall utter, put off, or offer, or cause to be uttered, put off, or offered in payment or for sale any such false, forged, altered, or counterfeited certificate, indent, or other public security, with intention to defraud any person, knowing the same to be false, altered, forged or counterfeited, and shall be thereof convicted, every such person shall suffer death.	Death	None

=== Crimes against the law of nations ===
Article One provides that Congress shall have the power "[t]o define and punish ... Offenses against the Law of Nations." According to Currie: "No reliance on inherent on implied powers over foreign affairs was necessary to justify" sections 26 and 28 as each "plausibly described" offenses against the law of nations. Congress had also created a civil offense against the law of nations in the Alien Tort Statute of the Judiciary Act of 1789.

Section	Common offense name	Text	Authorized sentence	Supreme Court cases
26	Interference with diplomatic immunity	[I]n case any person or person shall sue forth or prosecute any such writ or process, such person or persons, and all attorneys or solicitors prosecuting or soliciting in such case, and all officers executing any such writ or process, being thereof convicted, shall be deemed violaters of the laws of nations, and disturbers of the public repose, and imprisoned not exceeding three years, and fined at the discretion of the court.	3 years and fine	United States v. Phillips, 31 U.S. (6 Pet.) 776 (1832)
28	Passport obstruction or assault on ambassador	[I]f any person shall violate any safe conduct or passport duly obtained and issued under the authority of the United States, or shall assault, strike, wound, imprison, or in any other manner infract the law of nations, by offering violence to the person of an ambassador or other public minister, such person so offending, on conviction, shall be imprisoned not exceeding three years, and fined at the discretion of the court.	3 years and fine	United States v. Ortega, 24 U.S. (11 Wheat.) 467 (1826)

=== Exclusive federal jurisdiction ===
Several offenses were limited to acts committed in places "under the sole and exclusive jurisdiction of the United States". Such regulations would have applied in the "Seat of the Government", federal enclaves, and federal territories.

Article One provides that Congress shall have the power "[t]o exercise exclusive Legislation in all Cases whatsoever, over such District (not exceeding ten Miles square) as may, by Cession of particular States, and the acceptance of Congress, become the Seat of the Government of the United States, and to exercise like Authority over all Places purchased by the Consent of the Legislature of the State in which the Same shall be, for the Erection of Forts, Magazines, Arsenals, dock-Yards, and other needful Buildings." And Article Four provides that "Congress shall have Power to dispose of and make all needful Rules and Regulations respecting the Territory ..."

With reference to the "arms, ordnance, munition, shot, powder, or habiliments of war belonging to the United States" provision of section 16, Currie argues that it could have been justified under Congress's Article One power to "raise and support armies" or Congress's Article Four power to make needful rules respecting "property belonging to the United States".

In United States v. Bevans (1818), although the defendant had only been charged under § 8 of the Crimes Act, Chief Justice Marshall proceeded to consider whether the offense would have been cognizable under § 3. Following the canon of noscitur a sociis, Marshall interpreted the jurisdictional phrase "any fort, arsenal, dockyard, magazine, or in any other place, or district of country" to be limited to places that are "fixed and territorial" (i.e. not to include a navy vessel).

Crimes against persons

Section	Common offense name	Text	Authorized sentence	Supreme Court cases
3	Murder	[I]f any person or persons shall, within any fort, arsenal, dockyard, magazine, or in any other place, or district of country, under the sole and exclusive jurisdiction of the United States, commit the crime of wilful murder, such person or persons, on being thereof convicted, shall suffer death.	Death	United States v. Bevans, 16 U.S. (3 Wheat.) 336 (1818) (dicta)
7	Manslaughter	[I]f any person or persons shall, within any fort, arsenal, dockyard, magazine, or other place or district of country, under the sole and exclusive jurisdiction of the United States, commit the crime of manslaughter, and shall be thereof convicted, such person or persons shall be imprisoned not exceeding three years, and fined not exceeding one thousand dollars.	3 years and $1000	None
13	Mayhem	[I]f any person or persons, within the places upon the land under the sole and exclusive jurisdiction of the United States, or upon the high seas, in any vessel belonging to the United States, or to any citizen or citizens thereof, on purpose and of malice aforethought, shall unlawfully cut off the ear or ears, or cut out or disable the tongue, put out an eye, slit the nose, cut off the nose or a lip, or cut off or disable any limb or member of any person, with intention in so doing to maim or disfigure such person, in any of the manners before mentioned, then and in every such case the person or persons so offending, their counsellors, aiders and abettors (knowing of and privy to the offense aforesaid) shall on conviction, be imprisoned not exceeding seven years, and fined not exceeding one thousand dollars.	7 years and $1000	None

Crimes against property
Section	Common offense name	Text	Authorized sentence	Supreme Court cases
16	Larceny	[I]f any person within any of the places under the sole and exclusive jurisdiction of the United States, or upon the high seas, shall take and carry away, with an intent to steal or purloin the personal goods of another; or if any person or persons, having at any time hereafter the charge or custody of any arms, ordnance, munition, shot, powder, or habiliments of war belonging to the United States, or of any victuals provided for the victualing of any soldiers, gunners, marines or pioneers, shall for any lucre or gain, or wittingly, advisedly, and of purpose to hinder or impede the service of the United States, embezzle, purloin or convey away any of the said arms, ordnance, munition, shot or power, habiliments of war, or victuals, that then and in every of the cases aforesaid, the person or persons so offending, their counsellors, aiders and abettors (knowing of and privy to the offences aforesaid) shall, on conviction, be fined not exceeding the four-fold value of the property so stolen, embezzled or purloined; the one moiety to be paid to the owner of the goods, or the United States, as the case may be, and the other moiety to the informer and prosecutor, and be publicly whipped, not exceeding thirty-nine stripes.	4x fine and 39 stripes	United States v. Murphy, 41 U.S. (16 Pet.) 203 (1842)
17	Accessory after the fact to larceny	[I]f any person or persons, within any part of the jurisdiction of the United States as aforesaid, shall receive or buy any goods or chattels that shall be feloniously taken or stolen from any other person, knowing the same to be stolen, or shall receive, harbour or conceal any felons or thieves, knowing them to be so, he or they being of either of the said offences legally convicted, shall be liable to the like punishments as in the case of larceny before are prescribed.	4x fine and 39 stripes	None

Misprision
Section	Common offense name	Text	Authorized sentence	Supreme Court cases
6	Misprision of felony	[I]f any person or persons, having knowledge of the actual commission of the crime of wilful murder, or other felony, upon the high seas, or within any fort, arsenal, dockyard, magazine, or other place or district of country, under the sole and exclusive jurisdiction of the United States, shall conceal, and not, as soon as may be, disclose and make known the same to some one of the Judges, or other persons in civil or military authority under the United States, on conviction thereof, such person or persons shall be adjudged guilty of misprision of felony, and shall be imprisoned not exceeding three years, and fined not exceeding five hundred dollars.	3 years and $500	None

=== Integrity of the judicial process ===
The constitutional authorization of these crimes was less explicit, but Article One does provide that Congress shall have the power "[t]o constitute Tribunals inferior to the supreme Court." According to Currie:

This is the point at which explicit constitutional authority for the creation of federal crimes runs out. But the statute went on to define additional crimes: theft or falsification of court records, perjury, bribery of federal judges, interference with judicial process, and liberation of federal prisoners. All of these were plainly necessary and proper to the operation of the federal courts; Marshall was to cite the perjury section as precedent for the existence of implicit powers in McCulloch v. Maryland.

According to Stacy and Dayton, these provision are "compelling evidence that the founders did not intend the national role in criminal law to be limited to crimes expressly mentioned in the Constitution".

Section	Common offense name	Text	Authorized sentence	Supreme Court cases
5	Obstruction of dissection	[I]f any person or persons shall, after such execution had, by force rescue or attempt to rescue the body of such offender out of the custody of the marshall or his officers, during the conveyance of such body to any place for dissection as aforesaid; or shall by force rescue or attempt to rescue such body from the house of any surgeon, where the same shall have been deposited in pursuance of this act; every person so offending, shall be liable to a fine not exceeding one hundred dollars, and an imprisonment not exceeding twelve months.	1 year and $100	None
15	Corruption of judicial records	[I]f any person shall feloniously steal, take away, alter, falsify, or otherwise avoid any record, writ, process, or other proceedings in any of the courts of the United States, by means whereof any judgment shall be reversed, made void, or not take effect, or if any person shall acknowledge or procure to be acknowledged in any of the courts aforesaid, any recognizance, bail or judgment, in the name or names of any other person or persons not privy or consenting to the same, every such person or persons on conviction thereof, shall be fined not exceeding five thousand dollars, or be imprisoned not exceeding seven years, and be whipped not exceeding thirty-nine stripes. Provided nevertheless, That this act shall not extend to the acknowledgment of any judgment or judgments by any attorney or attorneys, duly admitted for any person or persons against whom any such judgment or judgments shall be had or given.	7 years or $5000, and 39 stripes	None
18	Perjury and subornation	[I]f any person shall wilfully and corruptly commit perjury, or shall by any means procure any person to commit corrupt and wilful perjury, on his or her oath or affirmation in any suit, controversy, matter or cause pending in any of the courts of the United States, or in any deposition taken pursuant to the laws of the United States, every person so offending, and being thereof convicted, shall be imprisoned not exceeding three years, and fined not exceeding eight hundred dollars; and shall stand in the pillory for one hour, and be thereafter rendered incapable of giving testimony in any of the courts of the United States, until such time as the judgment so given against the said offender shall be reversed.	3 years, $800, 1 hour pillory, and incapacity to testify	None
21	Judicial bribery	[I]f any person shall, directly or indirectly, give any sum or sums of money, or any other bribe, present or reward, or any promise, contract, obligation or security, for the payment or delivery of any money, present or reward, or any other thing to obtain or procure the opinion, judgment or decree of any judge or judges of the United States, in any suit, controversy, matter or cause depending before him or them, and shall be thereof convicted, such person or persons so giving, promising, contracting or securing to be given, paid or delivered, any sum or sums of money, present, reward or other bribe as aforesaid, and the judge or judges who shall in any wise accept or receive the same, on conviction thereof shall be fined and imprisoned at the discretion of the court; and shall forever be disqualified to hold any office of honour, trust or profit under the United States.	Imprisonment and fine and disqualification from office	None
22	Obstruction of judicial process	[I]f any person or persons shall knowingly and wilfully obstruct, resist or oppose any officer of the United States, in serving or attempting to serve or execute any mesne, process, or warrant, or any rule or order of any of the courts of the United States, or any other legal or judicial writ or process whatsoever, or shall assault, beat or wound any officer, or other person duly authorized, in serving or executing any writ, rule, order, process or warrant aforesaid, every person so knowingly and wilfully offending in the premises, shall, on conviction thereof, be imprisoned not exceeding twelve months, and fined not exceeding three hundred dollars.	1 year and $300	None
23	Prison break	[I]f any person or persons shall by force set at liberty, or rescue any person who shall be found guilty of treason, murder, or any other capital crime, or rescue any person convicted of any of the said crimes, going to execution, or during execution, every person so offending, and being thereof convicted, shall suffer death. And if any person shall by force set at liberty, or rescue any person who before conviction shall stand committed for any of the capital offences aforesaid; or if any person or persons shall by force set at liberty, or rescue any person committed for or convicted of any other offence against the United States, every person an offending shall, on conviction, be fined not exceeding five hundred dollars, and imprisoned not exceeding one year.	Death / 1 year and $500	None

== Criminal procedure ==
=== Statute of limitations ===
Section 32 provided for the following statutes of limitations: no statute of limitations for wilful murder or forgery; no statute of limitations for fugitives from justice; three (3) years for capital offenses (other than wilful murder and forgery); two (2) years for non-capital offenses. In United States v. Cook (1872), the Court held that indictments need not plead facts establishing that these limitations periods have not run.

=== Venue ===
Section 8 provided that "the trial of crimes committed on the high seas, or in any place out of the jurisdiction of any particular State, shall be in the district where the offender is apprehended, or into which he may first be brought". Thus, section 8 was an exercise of Congress's authority under Article Three to define criminal venue for all crimes "not committed within any State". But, the Supreme Court did not interpret section 8 as exercising the full extent of Congress's authority under Article Three. In Ex parte Bollman (1807), the Court held that the statutory term "any place out of the jurisdiction of any particular state" applied only to "any river, haven, bason or bay, not within the jurisdiction of any particular state", and only in "those cases there is no court which has particular cognizance of the crime".

=== Treason and capital cases ===
The Crimes Act prescribed death as the exclusive punishment for the crimes of treason, counterfeiting, wilful murder, and aiding the escape of a death row prisoner, as well as piracy, murder, and robbery on the high seas. Section 29 provided treason and capital defendants a right to a copy of the indictment, a list of the jury (and, in treason cases, witnesses), appointed counsel, and compulsory process:

[A]ny person who shall be accused and indicted of treason, shall have a copy of the indictment, and a list of the jury and witnesses, to be produced on the trial for proving the said indictment, mentioning the names and places of abode of such witnesses and jurors, delivered unto him at least three entire days before he shall be tried for the same; and in other capital offences, shall have such copy of the indictment and list of the jury two entire days at least before the trial: And that every person so accused and indicted for any of the crimes aforesaid, shall also be allowed and admitted to make his full defence by counsel learned in the law; and the court before whom such person shall be tried, or some judge thereof, shall, and they are hereby authorized and required immediately upon his request to assign to such person such counsel, not exceeding two, as such person shall desire, to whom such counsel shall have free at all reasonable hours; and every such person or persons accused or indicted of the crimes aforesaid, shall be allowed and admitted in his said defence to make any proof that he or they can produce, by lawful witness or witnesses, and shall have the like process of the court where he or they shall be tried, to compel his or their witnesses to appear at his or their trial, as is usually granted to compel witnesses to appear on the prosecution against them.

Most of the provisions of section 29 are plainly similar to those of the Sixth Amendment, namely the Information Clause, the Assistance of Counsel Clause, and the Compulsory Process Clause. The Sixth Amendment (and the remainder of the Bill of Rights) had not yet been ratified at the time of the Crimes Act's passage.

Section 30 provided treason and capital defendants with peremptory challenges and provided for a plea of not guilty in the case that the defendant refused to enter a plea:

if any person or persons be indicted of treason against the United States, and shall stand mute or refuse to plead, or shall challenge peremptorily above the number of thirty-five of the jury; or if any person or persons be indicted of other of the offences herein for which the punishment is declared to be death, if he or they shall also stand mute or will not answer to the indictment, or challenge peremptorily above the number of twenty persons of the jury; the court, in any of the cases aforesaid, shall notwithstanding proceed to the trial of the person or persons so standing mute or challenging, as if he or they had pleaded not guilty, and render judgment thereon accordingly.

In United States v. Shackleford (1855), the Court held that the section 30's allocation of peremptory challenges controlled, rather than an 1840 statute that required federal jury selection to generally follow state law (and, thus, the prosecutor was given no peremptory challenges in such cases). Ten years later, Congress abrogated Shackleford, granting prosecutors five peremptory challenges in treason and capital cases (and two in non-capital felony cases); the 1865 act left the defendant's number of peremptory challenges unchanged.

Section 31 eliminated the benefit of clergy for capital crimes. Section 33 designated the means of execution as "hanging ... by the neck until dead".

=== Perjury indictments ===
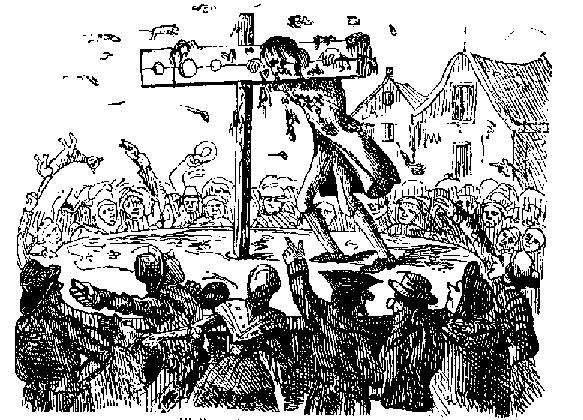
The Crimes Act provided for pillory as punishment for perjury.

Section 19, applicable to perjury prosecutions under section 18, provided that

in every presentment or indictment to be prosecuted against any person for wilful and corrupt perjury, it shall be sufficient to set forth the substance of the offence charged upon the defendant, and by what court, or before whom the oath or affirmation was taken, (averring such court, or person or persons to have a competent authority to administer the same) together with the proper averment or averments to falsify the matter or matters wherein the perjury or perjuries is or are assigned; without setting forth the bill, answer, information, indictment, declaration, or any part of any record or proceeding, either in law or equity, other than as aforesaid, and without setting forth the commission or authority of the court, or person or persons before whom the perjury was committed.

and section 20 provided that

in every presentment or indictment for subornation of perjury, or for corrupt bargaining or contracting with others to commit wilful and corrupt perjury, it shall be sufficient to set forth the substance of the offence charged upon the defendant, without setting forth the bill, answer, information, indictment, declaration, or any part of any record or proceeding, either in law or equity, and without setting forth the commmsion or authority of the court, or person or persons before whom the perjttry was committed, or was agreed or promised to be committed.

=== Sentencing ===
Section 24 provided that "no conviction or judgment of any of the offences aforesaid, shall work corruption of blood, or any forfeiture of estate". This generalized the guarantee of Article Three that "no Attainder of Treason shall work Corruption of Blood, or Forfeiture except during the Life of the Person attainted".

The Crimes Act made no provision for the creation of federal prisons. Instead, a September 21, 1789 concurrent resolution asked the state legislatures to authorize their prisons to imprison federal prisoners. The first federal prison was not opened until 1894 at Fort Leavenworth.

== Other provisions ==
=== Dissection ===
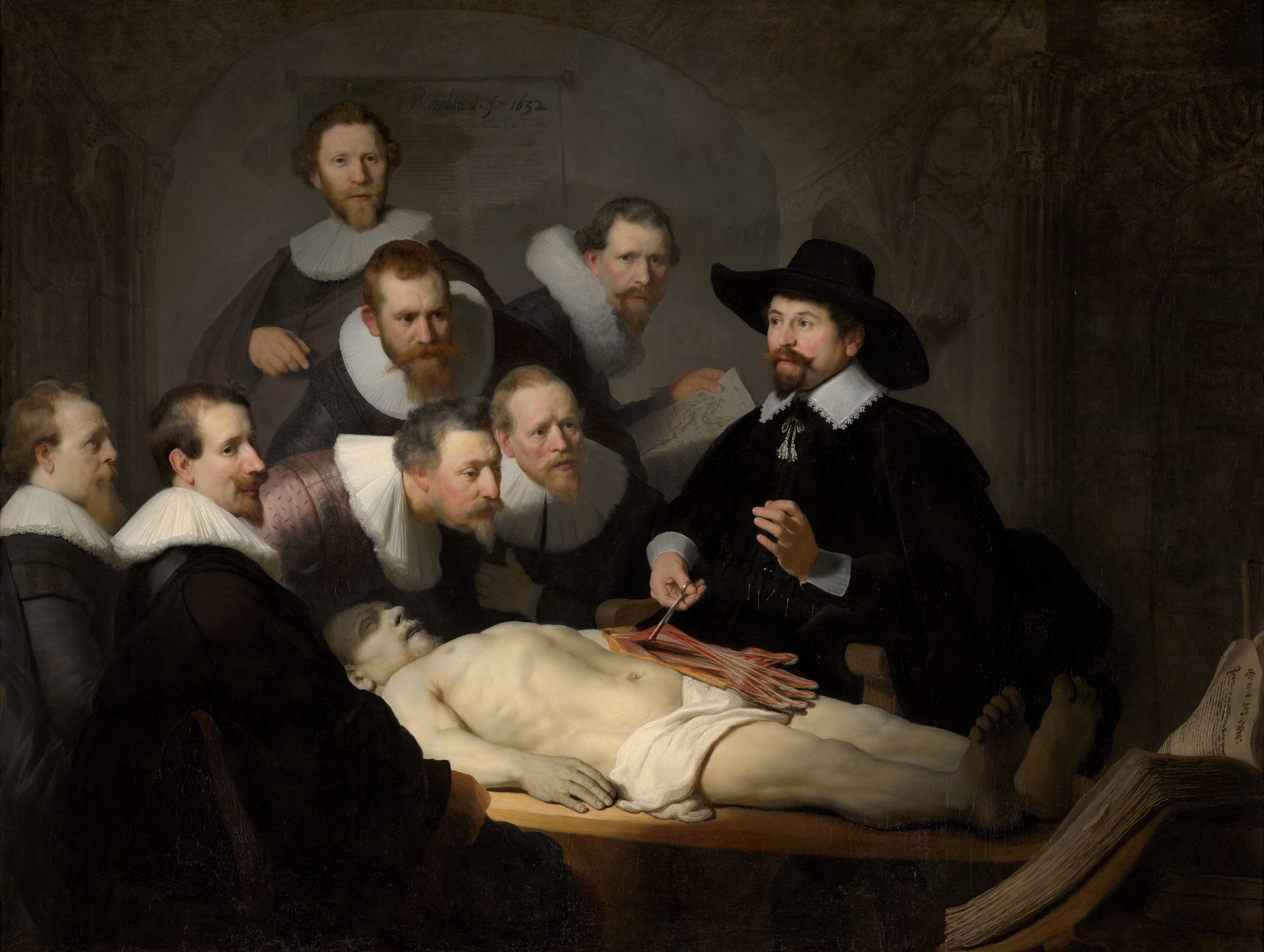
The Crimes Act provided for the dissection of murderers' corpses.

Section 4 authorized a court to order the post-execution dissection of the corpse of convicted murderers. According to David P. Currie, this was the "most controversial provision of the entire statute". Dissection as punishment had its roots in a 1789 New York statute and a 1752 English law. Rep. Michael J. Stone of Maryland argued against the inclusion of this provision as cruel. Currie argues that Congress was on a firm constitutional footing in enacting this provision in relation to murders committed in areas under exclusive federal jurisdiction, but perhaps less so for murders committed on the high seas.

=== Diplomatic immunity ===
Section 25 provided:

[I]f any writ or process shall at any time hereafter be sued forth or prosecuted by any person or persons, in any of the courts of the United States, or in any of the courts of a particular state, or by any judge or justice therein respectively, whereby the person of any ambassador or other public minister of any foreign prince or state, authorized and received as such by the President of the United States, or any domestic or domestic servant of any much ambassador or other public minister, may be arrested or imprisoned, or his or their goods or chattels be distrained, seized or attached, such writ or process shall be deemed and adjudged to be utterly null and void to all intents, construction and purposes whatsoever.

Section 27 provided a limited exception for private debts contracted by ambassadors prior to the passage of the act.

== Prosecutions ==
Between 1790 and 1797, only 147 criminal cases were brought in the circuit courts, and more than half of those cases were brought in the Pennsylvania circuit court concerning the Whiskey Rebellion. And, between 1790 and 1801, only 426 criminal cases were brought in all federal courts (the district courts and the circuit courts combined).

== Amendments and repeals ==
Section 1 was supplemented by an omnibus treason law during the Civil War, which, among other things, provided for punishments other than death and additional lesser offenses. The offense of treason, and the punishment thereof, were codified in consecutive sections of the Revised Statutes. Both were repealed and replaced by the Criminal Code of 1909. During the 1948 re-codification of the Criminal Code, the treason offense was amended and moved to 18 U.S.C. § 2381, where it remains. It was amended in 1994.

Section 2 was codified in the Revised Statutes, and re-codified by the Criminal Code of 1909, and the 1948 re-codification. It was amended in 1994.

Section 3 was amended by § 4 of the Crimes Act of 1825 and codified in the Revised Statutes.

Sections 4, 5 and 6 were codified in the Revised Statutes.

Section 7 was amended in 1857 and 1875 and codified in the Revised Statutes.

Section 8 was amended in 1820, 1835, and 1846 and codified in five sections of the Revised Statutes. Further, § 8 was supplemented by additional prohibitions in § 5 of an 1819 act and § 3 of an 1820 act. Despite the similarity of the provisions, all three were all separately codified in the Revised Statutes in 1874. Section 8 was repealed by the Criminal Code of 1909. Section 8's venue provision was re-enacted by § 14 of the Crimes Act of 1825, with minor changes.

Sections 9 and 10 were codified in the Revised Statutes. Section 11 was codified in two sections.

Section 12 was amended in 1835 and codified in two sections of the Revised Statutes.

Section 13 was codified in the Revised Statutes.

Section 14 was repealed by § 17 of the Crimes Act of 1825, which broadened the offense of counterfeiting and reduced authorized the punishment from death to 10 years hard labor and a $5000 fine. Sections 18 through 21 of the 1825 Act created additional counterfeiting offenses.

Section 15 was amended in 1874 and codified in the Revised Statutes.

Section 16 was amended in 1842 and codified in the Revised Statutes.

Section 17 was amended by § 8 of the Crimes Act of 1825 and codified in the Revised Statutes.

Section 18 was amended by § 13 of the Crimes Act of 1825—which defined the term "perjury" and increased the authorized punishment to 5 years hard labor and a $3000 fine—and further amended in 1874 and 1876. Perjury and subornation were separately codified in the Revised Statutes.

Section 19 was codified in three sections of the Revised Statutes, and Section 21 was codified in two.

Section 22 was amended in 1866 and codified in the Revised Statutes.

Sections 23 and 24 were codified in the Revised Statutes.

Sections 25 through 29 were not codified in Title LXX of the Revised Statutes.

Section 30, with regard to peremptory challenges, was re-enacted and supplemented in 1865. Section 30, with regard to a defendant's failure to enter a plea, was extended from capital to all crimes by § 14 of the Crimes Act of 1825.

Section 31 and 33 were codified in the Revised Statutes.

== Constitutionality ==
According to Taylor: "Like the Judiciary Act of 1789, the Process Act of 1789, and the Crimes Act of 1790, having been passed by the First Congress, are perhaps the statutes most informative of an original understanding of Congress's constitutional power over the federal judiciary."

According to Kurland, "for the most part, Congress enacted statutes that closely tracked the specific constitutional grants of federal criminal authority. However, Congress continued to venture slightly, but significantly, into areas outside the specific constitutional grants." As examples in the later category, Kurland cites the provisions concerning the integrity of the federal criminal process, bribery, misprison of treason, and the revenue provisions.

Currie notes that the Crimes Act "resolved a number of interesting constitutional questions". For example, with reference to the punishments of "stripes" and disqualification from office, Currie argues that: "These provisions suggest not only that Congress viewed neither of these punishments as cruel and unusual, but also that they did not understand impeachment to be the sole avenue for the future disqualification of current officeholders." Taylor goes further in arguing the disqualification provision was not merely prospective: "The Crimes Act of 1790 indicates that, beyond its plenary power over federal court jurisdiction and procedure, the First Congress believed it had the constitutional power to make conviction by a court an alternative means of removing a federal judge, outside the impeachment context, and it sheds light on the First Congress's understanding of its own powers to discipline federal judges."

Similarly, the Supreme Court and individual justices have cited the Crimes Act's authorization of the death penalty as evidence that the founders believed it was constitutional.
