= United States v. Brewster =

United States v. Brewster could refer to:

- United States v. Brewster (1833), 32 U.S. (7 Pet.) 164 (1833) (per curiam), on counterfeiting
- United States v. Brewster (1972), 408 U.S. 501 (1972), on bribery and the Speech or Debate Clause
