= Nathaniel Gordon =

American slave trader (1826–1862)

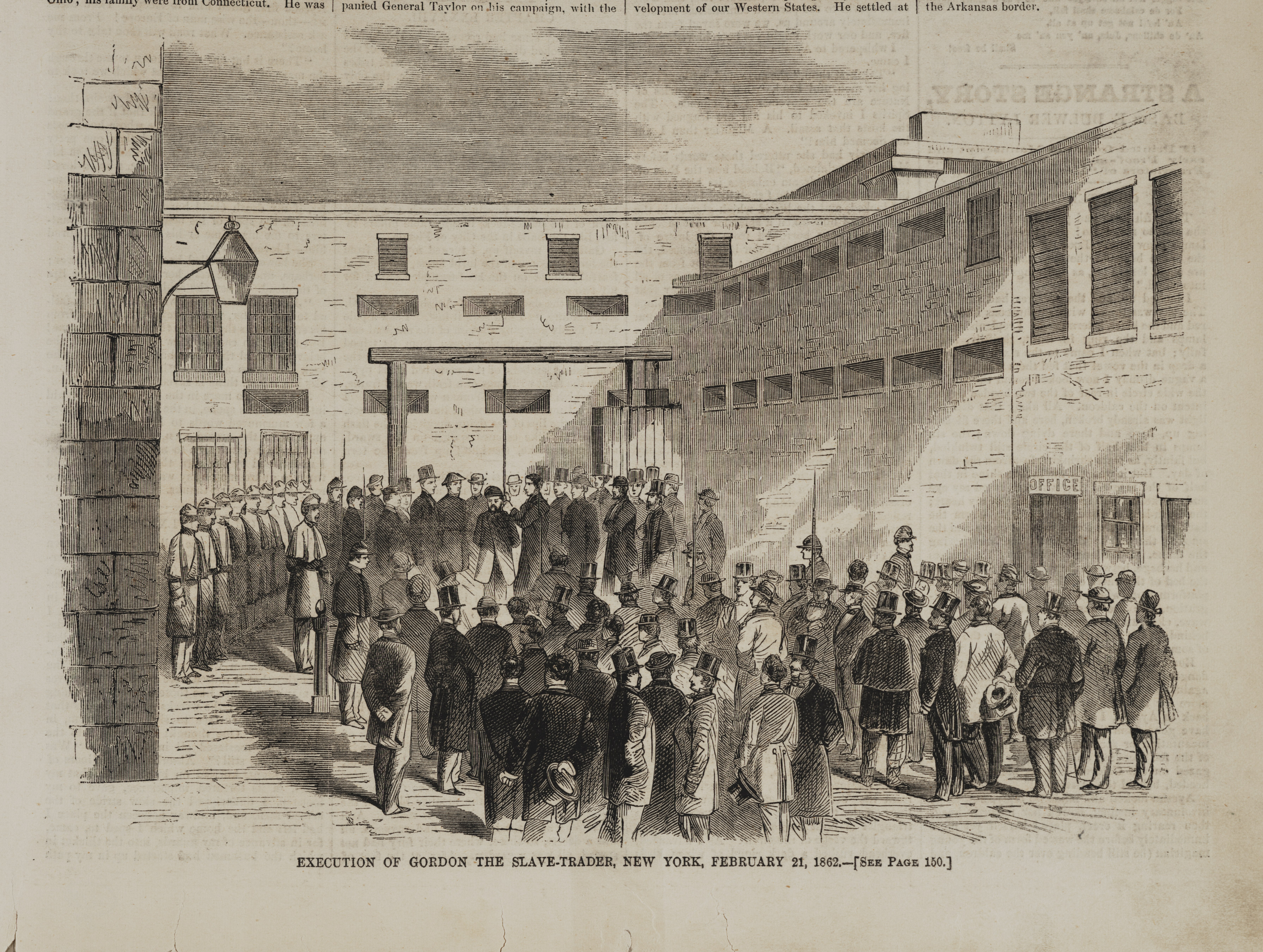
- An 1862 illustration of Gordon's execution
- Born: February 6, 1826; Portland, Maine, U.S.
- Died: February 21, 1862 (aged 36); Tombs Prison, New York, U.S.
- Status: Executed by hanging
- Motive: Financial gain
- Conviction: Engaging in the slave trade
- Penalty: Death

Details
- Victims: Hundreds
- Span of crimes: 1851 – August 8, 1860 (allegedly did another voyage in 1848)
- Locations: Atlantic Ocean; Western Africa
- Target: Africans
- Date apprehended: August 8, 1860

Nathaniel Gordon (February 6, 1826 – February 21, 1862) was an American slave trader who was the only person in the United States to be tried, convicted, and executed by the federal government for having "engaged in the slave trade", which was deemed an act of piracy when committed by American citizens under the Piracy Law of 1820. As such, Gordon was also the last person to be executed for piracy in the United States.

== Early life ==
Gordon was born in Portland, Maine. He went into shipping and eventually owned his own ship. He had a wife named Elizabeth and a two-year-old son named Nathaniel at the time of his final voyage to Africa.

When Gordon was 12, his father was arrested for attempting to smuggle slaves into the United States. The law stated that he should be deemed a pirate and given a mandatory death sentence. However, there are no records of how the case was resolved, albeit it is known that Gordon's father was not executed.

== Slave trading ==
In 1848, Gordon's boat, Juliet, was searched by the U.S. Navy for evidence of slave trading. After no evidence of slave trading could be found, Gordon was released from their custody. However, there were allegations that Gordon had indeed gone to Africa, taken a cargo of slaves, and returned to Brazil, where slavery and the slave trade was still legal at the time.

In 1851, Gordon, captaining the Camargo, went on another expedition from Brazil to Africa. Gordon took on 500 Africans and set sail for Brazil. He had to take numerous measures to avoid naval patrol ships, but was still chased by a British man-of-war. After arriving in Brazil and dropping off the Africans, Gordon burned his ship to destroy evidence. The Africans were seized and some of his men were arrested and charged. Gordon himself escaped by dressing in women's clothes.

Shortly after the Camargo voyage, Gordon, captaining Ottawa, made a slaving voyage to Cuba, where slavery was also still legal, with a cargo of Africans. Only about 25 percent of the Africans survived, with Gordon later claiming that a rival trader had poisoned them. After landing in Cuba, Gordon again burned his ship afterwards to destroy evidence.

In late July 1860, Gordon set sail aboard the Erie for the west coast of Africa. On August 7, 1860, he loaded 897 slaves at Sharks Point, Congo River, West Africa, of whom only 172 were grown men and 162 grown women. Gordon preferred to carry children because they would not rise up to free themselves. The day after loading, Erie sailed from the Congo River, only to be captured by the USS Mohican within hours. Commander Sylvanus William Godon had a prize crew take command of Erie and ordered them to first transport the freed slaves to Liberia, and then return to New York. Liberia was the American colony established in West Africa by the American Colonization Society for the settlement of free blacks from the United States. According to reports, during the 15-day passage to Liberia at least 29 captives died and their bodies were thrown overboard. In New York, the ship was to be auctioned off, and Nathaniel Gordon, first mate William Warren, and second mate David Hall would stand trial.

Commander Godon had four other of Gordon's crewmen placed on the USS Marion: Thomas Nelson, Samuel Sleeper, Thomas Savage, and John McCafferty. Marion sailed to Portsmouth, New Hampshire, where they were put on trial. In November 1860, the four crewmen were convicted of voluntarily serving on a slave ship but acquitted of engaging in the slave trade. They were each fined $1 and sentenced to 3.5 months in prison.

== Trials ==
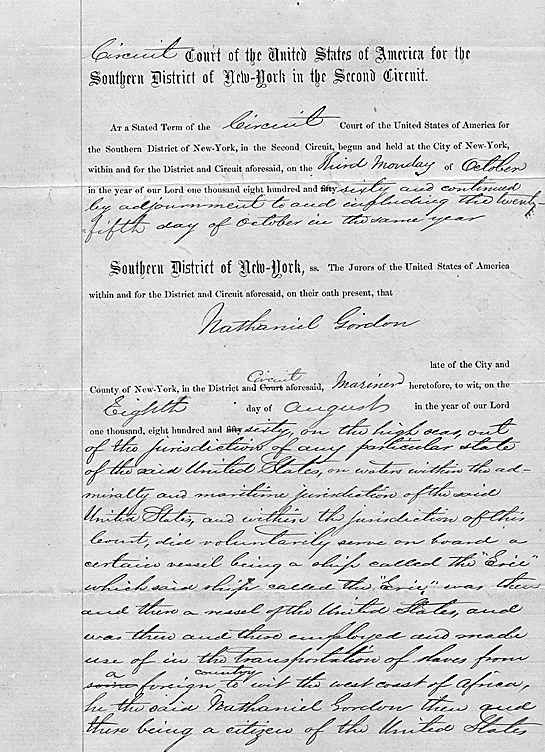
Presentment by a federal grand jury, charging Nathaniel Gordon before the US District Court for the Southern District of New York with the crime of slave trading, October 25, 1860

The United States Attorney for the Southern District of New York, James I. Roosevelt, offered Gordon a $2,000 fine and two-year sentence in exchange for information about his financial backers. However, Gordon, confident that he wouldn't face any severe consequences, rejected the deal, believing it was not lenient enough. The case was repeatedly delayed due to the onset of the Civil War. By the time of Gordon's trial, a new district attorney, Edward Delafield Smith, had been appointed. Smith saw the Gordon case as a chance to become prominent and an opportunity to set an example for all future slave traders. He wanted Gordon executed.

Gordon's first trial in New York City in June 1861 ended in a mistrial, with the jury voting 7–5 in favor of a conviction, allegedly due to bribes. Smith immediately pushed for a retrial. To counter potential tampering and bribes, the government had the jury sequestered. Among the arguments used by Gordon's lawyers during his second trial were technicalities that had successfully been exploited in other trials:

- The federal government did not have the authority to try Gordon, on the ground that Erie was not an American ship, because it had been sold to foreigners.
- Gordon himself may not be an American, since his mother sometimes accompanied his father on his voyages, which meant he might've been born at sea.
- Gordon had sailed so far into the Congo that he was in Portuguese waters and thus not under the jurisdiction of the federal government.
- Gordon was just a passenger and ceased to be the captain of the Erie after two Spaniards came aboard.

The first three arguments were dismissed by the judge, while the fourth argument was contradicted by witnesses' testimony. On November 9, 1861, Gordon was found guilty of piracy by engaging in the slave trade. The prosecution was led by Assistant United States District Attorney George Pierce Andrews. Gordon received the death sentence mandated under the law, with the execution date set for February 7, 1862. In passing sentence, Judge W. D. Shipman, in the course of his address to the prisoner, said:

You are soon to be confronted with the terrible consequences of your crime, and it is proper that I should call to your mind the duty of preparing for that event which will soon terminate your mortal existence, and usher you into the presence of the Supreme Judge.

Let me implore you to seek the spiritual guidance of the ministers of religion; and let your repentance be as humble and thorough as your crime was great. Do not attempt to hide its enormity from yourself; think of the cruelty and wickedness of seizing nearly a thousand fellow-beings, who never did you harm, and thrusting them beneath the decks of a small ship, beneath a burning tropical sun, to die in of disease or suffocation, or be transported to distant lands, and be consigned, they and their posterity, to a fate far more cruel than death.

Think of the sufferings of the unhappy beings whom you crowded on the Erie; of their helpless agony and terror as you took them from their native land; and especially think of those who perished under the weight of their miseries on the passage from the place of your capture to Monrovia! Remember that you showed mercy to none, carrying off as you did, not only those of your own sex, but women and helpless children.

Do not flatter yourself that because they belonged to a different race from yourself your guilt is therefore lessened – rather fear that it is increased. In the just and generous heart, the humble and the weak inspire compassion, and call for pity and forbearance. As you are soon to pass into the presence of that God of the black man as well as the white man, who is no respecter of persons, do not indulge for a moment the thought that he hears with indifference the cry of the humblest of his children. Do not imagine that because others shared in the guilt of this enterprise, yours, is thereby diminished; but remember the awful admonition of your Bible, 'Though hand joined in hand, the wicked shall not go unpunished.'

In February 1862, Smith allowed William Warren and David Hall to plead guilty to lesser charges under the Slave Trade Act of 1800. Warren, who claimed he was not an American citizen, was sentenced to 8 months in prison, and Hall was sentenced to 9 months in prison. Since both men were broke, they were fined only $1. At sentencing, Judge Shipman told Hall that he was being treated very leniently and warned him "if caught engaged in it again, the punishment would be severe."

== Appeals for pardon ==
After Gordon's conviction, his supporters appealed to President Abraham Lincoln for a pardon. Over 11,000 people in New York signed a petition for requesting clemency for Gordon. Although Lincoln was well known among his contemporaries for issuing many pardons during his presidency, he refused to consider one for Gordon, even going so far as to refuse to meet with Gordon's supporters. Lincoln said at the time, "I believe I am kindly enough in nature, and can be moved to pity and to pardon the perpetrator of almost the worst crime that the mind of man can conceive or the arm of man can execute; but any man, who, for paltry gain and stimulated only by avarice, can rob Africa of her children to sell into interminable bondage, I never will pardon."

On the question of a commutation, Lincoln wrote that, "I think I would personally prefer to let this man live in confinement and let him meditate on his deeds, yet in the name of justice and the majesty of law, there ought to be one case, at least one specific instance, of a professional slave-trader, a Northern white man, given the exact penalty of death because of the incalculable number of deaths he and his kind inflicted upon black men amid the horror of the sea-voyage from Africa." Lincoln did give him a two-week stay of execution to "[make] the necessary preparation for the awful change which awaits him", setting the new execution date for February 21, 1862, on the grounds that Gordon had been misled into thinking he would not be executed.

Governor Edwin D. Morgan sent a telegram to Lincoln, requesting a last-minute reprieve. However, it went unanswered.

== Execution ==
Early the morning before the execution, Gordon unsuccessfully attempted suicide with strychnine poison. Three doctors worked four hours to keep him alive by pumping his stomach, catheterizing him, and force-feeding him brandy and whiskey. After regaining consciousness, he cried out "I've cheated you! I've cheated you!" Gordon then begged the doctors assist his suicide, saying he would rather die alone than suffer the humiliation of being publicly executed. He said he'd "suffered the agony of a dozen deaths." He was sufficiently revived to be fit enough for execution. Gordon's last words, spoken to his executioner, were: "Make short work of it now, Bill. I'm ready."

The New York correspondent of the Cork Examiner reported on the death in the paper's 17 March 1862 edition:

Standing near me at the execution of Captain Gordon to-day was Edwin James, the celebrated criminal lawyer of England. He is getting posted in our criminal matters. James said it was one of the most delightful executions he had ever attended, and what seemed to surprise him the most was this fact–that none but gentlemen were present. There were not over 50 persons present besides the soldiers of the United States Marine.

== See also ==
- Capital punishment by the United States federal government
- List of last executions in the United States by crime
- List of white defendants executed for killing a black victim
