= Party admission =

Exception to hearsay in law of evidence

The party admission, in the law of evidence, is a type of statement that appears to be hearsay (an out of court statement) but is generally exempted (excluded) from the definition of hearsay because it was made by a party to the litigation adverse to the party introducing it into evidence.

== Party admissions in U.S. law ==
In the USA, a party admission, in the law of evidence, is any statement made by a declarant who is a party to a lawsuit or criminal case, which is offered as evidence against that party. Under the Federal Rules of Evidence, such a statement is admissible to prove the truth of the statement itself, meaning that the statement itself is not considered hearsay at all. This is a category of exemptions to the inadmissibility of out-of-court statements. When the term "exemption" is used here, it does not mean that the statement is an "exception" to the hearsay rule. Rather, a party admission is classified as "nonhearsay" by the Federal Rules of Evidence.

The statement is admissible even if the declarant had no basis for knowing the truth of the statement. For example, if an employee rushes to tell the manager of a trucking company that one of his trucks has been in an accident, and the manager says, "oh, we're behaving so negligently, lately," that statement will be admissible – even though the manager had no reason to know that this particular accident was the result of negligence.

The exemption permits one party to offer the out-of-court statement of any opponent party. It may not be used by a party to offer that party's own out-of-court statement. However, under the common-law doctrine of completeness, a party may possibly be able to admit some statements of their own, if a party admission exemption allows the opponent to admit part of a statement, and the first party wishes to admit the rest of that statement.

=== The rationale for the rule ===
The rationale for a party admission exception to hearsay exclusion can be mostly easily understood by reference to the rationale for the hearsay rule itself. Affidavit evidence consisting of out-of-court statements is not subject to cross-examination. Affidavit evidence is thought to detract from the truth-finding mission of a trial. The accuracy or credibility of affidavits lack the transparency that cross-examination exacts, but—at least in civil cases—a party may be cross-examined or give an explanation or denial of its admission. In criminal cases, however, "modern psychological interrogation techniques can cause innocent suspects" to falsely admit to crimes. Therefore, depending on the context, party admissions may advance, rather than detract from, the truth-finding mission.

=== Distinction between "party admissions" and "statements against interest" ===
There is frequent confusion about whether a "party admission" has to be a statement that is against the interests of its maker. The word "admission" connotes that the statement must be harmful. However, the party admission exemption does not in any way require that the admission be a representation against the party's interest – a "statement against interest."

"Statements against interest" made by other witnesses are sometimes admissible over the hearsay exception, but that is covered by a different exception. The "statements against interest" rule is different because:

1. It is party neutral (the hearsay exemption is party-specific).
2. The declarant must be unavailable.
3. The statement must be against the penal interest (under federal rules of evidence) or the fiscal or social interest (under the rules of states not following the federal rules).
4. The "statements against interest" rule has a rationale that is different from the party admission rule. The courts that created that exception assumed it unlikely that a person would make a statement against his own interest untruthfully. The party admission, as shown above, has nothing to do with this.

=== Extensions of the rule ===
The reach of Federal Rule of Evidence 801(d)(2) extends beyond simple statements of a party's own making, which is exempted under 801(d)(2)(A). It also applies to statements made by others, if the party manifests belief and approval. Further, it applies to vicarious admissions – those made by a declarant authorized by the party to make the statement, or by a servant or agent, if it concerns a matter within the scope of the servant. Finally, it allows admission of any statement made by a co-conspirator in furtherance of the conspiracy, provided there is independent evidence of the conspiracy's existence.

With regard to adoptive admissions, even a party's silence can be a basis for admitting evidence under this exemption. In some jurisdictions, the court is required to let the jury consider whether the silence was an adoptive admission.

The rule creates an issue in criminal prosecutions of multiple defendants. The use of a party admission of one defendant is not generally allowed to be considered against the second, unless they are co-conspirators.

=== The differing role of the party admission in federal and state law ===
The Party Admission rule is nearly universal in the U.S. Many states follow the Federal Rules of Evidence, but some do not. Those states do not draw a distinction between "exemptions" and "exceptions." However, the party admission is still admissible under all of the same circumstances as in rule 801(d).
