= Act to protect the commerce of the United States and punish the crime of piracy =

United States law to protect commerce on high seas

Piracy Act of 1819
- Other short titles: 1819 James Monroe Piracy Act
- Long title: An Act to protect the commerce of the United States, and punish the crime of piracy.
- Acronyms (colloquial): PSA
- Nicknames: Piracy Suppression Act of 1819
- Enacted by: the 15th United States Congress
- Effective: March 3, 1819

Citations
- Public law: Pub. L. 15–77
- Statutes at Large: 3 Stat. 510, Chap. 77

Codification
- Titles amended: 33 U.S.C.: Navigable Waters
- U.S.C. sections created: 33 U.S.C. ch. 7 § 381 et seq.

Legislative history
- Introduced in the Senate and House by; Daniel D. Tompkins (D-R–NY); Henry Clay (D-R–KY); Passed the Senate on February 24, 1819 (Passed); Passed the House on March 1, 1819 (Passed); Signed into law by President James Monroe on March 3, 1819

Major amendments
- ☆ P.L. 16-113, 3 Stat. 600, 1820; ☆ P.L. 17-7, 3 Stat. 721, 1823; ☆ P.L. 37-48, 12 Stat. 314, 1861

An Act to protect the commerce of the United States and punish the crime of piracy is an 1819 United States federal statute against piracy, amended in 1820 to declare participating in the slave trade or robbing a ship to be piracy when those involved were Americans. The last execution for piracy in the United States was of slave trader Nathaniel Gordon in 1862 in New York, under the amended act.

== Background ==
The original act, passed in 1819, was officially known as "An act to protect the commerce of the United States and punish the crime of piracy" (Pub. L. 15–77, 3 Stat. 510, enacted March 3, 1819), and provided in section 5, "That if any person or persons whatsoever shall, on the high seas, commit the crime of piracy, as defined by the law of nations, and such offender or offenders shall afterwards be brought into or found in the United States, every such offender or offenders shall, upon conviction thereof... be punished by death." Section 6 set the act to expire at "the end of the next session of Congress."

This original 1819 act was amended by "An Act to continue in force 'An act to protect the commerce of the United States and punish the crime of piracy', and also to make further provisions for punishing the crime of piracy" (Pub. L. 16–113, 3 Stat. 600, enacted May 15, 1820), sometimes known as the "1820 Piracy Law." It extended the original act to two years afterward and then to the end of the next session of Congress after that.

It also added three types of piracy:

- In section 3, robbery of a ship, its crew, or contents was declared piracy, punishable by death.
- In section 4, to seize or "decoy" onto a ship "any negro or mulatto, not held to service or labour by the laws of either of the states or territories of the United States with intent to make such negro or mulatto a slave" was also declared piracy punishable by death.
- In section 5, attempting to confine, deliver, or sell a negro or mulatto (similarly qualified as "not held to service", etc.) was also declared piracy punishable by death.

The act was made "perpetual" by the 17th United States Congress (Pub. L. 17–7, 3 Stat. 721, enacted January 30, 1823).

== James Smith trial of 1854 ==
In November 1854, United States Attorney John McKeon arraigned James Smith, the captain of the American ship Julia Moulton, for having violated the Anti-Piracy Act of 1820 by hauling 645 slaves from Ambriz to the island of Trinidad. Despite his protestations that his real name was Julius Schmidt, a native of Hanover, Germany, and not a naturalized American citizen and thus not subject to American law, Smith became the first person to be convicted under the 1820 provisions, which called for a death sentence.

Upon appeal a mistrial was declared, based upon various legal technicalities. Smith was then allowed to plead guilty to a lesser charge. He was sentenced two years in prison and fined $1000. After Smith served his sentence, he petitioned President James Buchanan for a pardon. Buchanan granted Smith a pardon in 1857, nullifying his fine.

== Nathaniel Gordon trial of 1862 ==
Nathaniel Gordon was the only American slave trader to be tried, convicted, and executed "for being engaged in the slave trade" under this law. He was hanged in New York on February 21, 1862.

== See also ==
- Crimes Act of 1790
- United States v. Jackalow (1862)
- Slave Trade Acts
- Piracy in the Atlantic World
- West Indies anti-piracy operations of the United States
- Post-1808 importation of slaves to the United States
