= Capias pro fine =

Capias pro fine are writs or warrants issued after the defendant fails to comply with a court's order to pay a fine.

The writ is considered outstanding until paid in full. The recipient usually must remain in jail until fees and/or costs have been satisfied by time served or the fees and/or costs have been paid in full.

In many jurisdictions, including Texas, a defendant taken into custody under a capias pro fine is not transported directly to jail, but is taken before the court which issued the capias and required to show cause why the terms of the judgment were not fulfilled. If the defendant cannot demonstrate good cause, then the defendant can be confined until the terms are lawfully discharged.

== See also ==
- Debtor's prison
