= United States v. Hamilton =

- Supreme Court of the United States

Argued February 18, 1795 Decided February 20, 1795
- Full case name: The United States v. John Hamilton
- Citations: 3 U.S. 17 (more) 3 Dall. 17; 1 L. Ed. 490; 1795 U.S. LEXIS 326

Holding
- A defendant committed on a charge of treason is bailable.

Court membership
- Chief Justice John Jay Associate Justices James Wilson · William Cushing; John Blair Jr. · James Iredell; William Paterson

Case opinion
- Majority: Wilson, joined by unanimous

United States v. Hamilton, (Note: Also called Ex parte Hamilton, following the modern style of habeas cases.) 3 U.S. (3 Dall.) 17 (1795), was a United States Supreme Court case in which a defendant charged with treason was released on bail, despite having been imprisoned under a warrant of committal issued by a district court judge. The Judiciary Act of 1789 provided that "upon all arrests in criminal cases, bail shall be admitted, except where the punishment may be death, in which cases it shall not be admitted but by the supreme or a circuit court, or by a justice of the supreme court, or a judge of a district court, who shall exercise their discretion therein, regarding the nature and circumstances of the offence, and of the evidence, and the usages of law." Ordinarily, habeas corpus was used to release prisoners held by the executive authority, but not those committed under a court order. Hamilton's attorney argued that the district court judge did not hold a hearing before issuing the warrant for his commitment to jail, and that the affidavits alleging treasonous activity were weak, while the government contended that the Judiciary Act did not grant the Supreme Court the jurisdiction to review the district court's decision unless there was new information or misconduct. The Supreme Court granted bail, without addressing the arguments of either attorney.

== Background ==
In 1794, a protest against the Whiskey Tax of 1791 escalated into an armed insurrection against the United States called the Whiskey Rebellion. The insurrection collapsed as the federal army marched west into western Pennsylvania in October 1794. The army encountered no resistance. Upon arrival, the army prepared to arrest rebel leaders. With little regard for due process, troops carried out raids on the night of November 13, breaking into houses and rousing suspects from their beds. No distinction was made between rebels and witnesses. Captives were driven, in their nightclothes and barefoot, over muddy roads and streams, to be held in floorless animal pens and basements. Some had their health ruined, and at least one died. The night was remembered locally as "the Dreadful Night" for years. About 150 people were arrested.

Among the captured rebels was the sheriff of Washington County, John Hamilton, who had not played a significant role in planning the insurrection. Judge Richard Peters ordered Hamilton to be jailed without a hearing pending his trial. Contemporaries thought that Judge Peters treated the accused so severely for political reasons, to ensure that some people were punished with incarceration when it was evident that few people would ultimately be convicted for their roles in the insurrection.

Hamilton and a group of insurrectionists was marched under guard from Washington County in the west side of Pennsylvania to be tried by Philadelphia courts in the east. The United States circuit court for Pennsylvania was scheduled to convene there in April. The party arrived on December 25, 1794, after one month of marching through the snow, and was paraded through the streets as prisoners.

The accused insurrectionists were represented by Moses Levy and William Lewis. In February, Hamilton was one of three accused people who sought a writ of habeas corpus from the United States Supreme Court. These people also requested and an accelerated hearing by a United States circuit court. At the time, judges of the circuit courts literally "rode circuit" by traveling from area to area.

== Supreme Court ==
The Supreme Court issued Hamilton's habeas writ on February 14 because the government did not oppose it.

The court heard oral arguments to consider Hamilton's bail argument on February 18.

On February 20, the court issued an opinion ordering Hamilton to be released on a total of $8,000 bail. Hamilton put up $4,000 himself. Presley Neville put up $2,000. Thomas Scott put up $2,000.

However, the court declined to convene the circuit court in Philadelphia early. Although the justices were inclined to grant that request, they considered it a practical impossibility.

== Aftermath ==
Upon the success of Hamilton's habeas case, Lewis petitioned the Supreme Court again for Reverend John Corbly. However, unlike in Hamilton's case, the government opposed the habeas writ. The Supreme Court responded that they were divided on the issue of whether to grant the writ, and so they could not grant it. Nevertheless, Justice William Paterson issued a recognizance on March 4 that authorized Corbly's release on bail. Corbly and two others paid $1,300 each to secure his release.

Hamilton was charged with misprision of treason, but he was not indicted.

Ultimately, only two Whiskey Rebellion cases were taken to trial in the circuit court at Philadelphia. Both were found guilty, in United States v. Vigol and United States v. Mitchell. Both were pardoned by President George Washington, who issued a general amnesty for the participants of the Whiskey Rebellion.
