= United States v. More =

- Supreme Court of the United States

Argued February 6, 1805 Decided March 2, 1805
- Full case name: United States v. Benjamin More
- Citations: 7 U.S. 159 (more) 3 Cranch 159; 2 L. Ed. 397

Case history
- Prior: Demurrer to indictment sustained (C.C.D.C. 1803)
- Subsequent: None

Holding
- The Supreme Court has no jurisdiction to hear writs of error from the circuit courts in criminal cases

Court membership
- Chief Justice John Marshall Associate Justices William Cushing · William Paterson; Samuel Chase · Bushrod Washington; William Johnson

Case opinion
- Majority: Marshall, joined by unanimous

Laws applied
- U.S. Const. art. III, § 2, cl. 2; District of Columbia Organic Act of 1801

United States v. More, 7 U.S. (3 Cranch) 159 (1805), was a United States Supreme Court case in which the Court held that it had no jurisdiction to hear appeals from criminal cases in the circuit courts by writs of error. Relying on the Exceptions Clause, More held that Congress's enumerated grants of appellate jurisdiction to the Court operated as an exercise of Congress's power to eliminate all other forms of appellate jurisdiction.

The second of forty-one criminal cases heard by the Marshall Court, More ensured that the Court's criminal jurisprudence would be limited to writs of error from the state (and later, territorial) courts, original habeas petitions and writs of error from habeas petitions in the circuit courts, and certificates of division and mandamus from the circuit courts. Congress did not grant the Court jurisdiction to hear writs of error from the circuit courts in criminal cases until 1889, for capital crimes, and 1891, for other "infamous" crimes. The Judicial Code of 1911 abolished the circuit courts, transferred the trial of crimes to the district courts, and extended the Court's appellate jurisdiction to all crimes. But, these statutory grants were construed not to permit writs of error filed by the prosecution, as in More.

More arose from the same Federalist/Jeffersonian political dispute over the judiciary that gave rise to Marbury v. Madison (1803) and Stuart v. Laird (1803). Benjamin More, a justice of the peace in the District of Columbia, argued that the repeal of statutory provisions authorizing compensation for his office violated the salary-protection guarantees for federal judges in Article Three of the United States Constitution. Below, a divided panel of the United States Circuit Court of the District of Columbia had sided with More, interpreted the repeal act prospectively, and sustained his demurrer to the criminal indictment for the common law crime of exacting illegal fees under color of office.

== Background ==
=== United States presidential election, 1800 ===
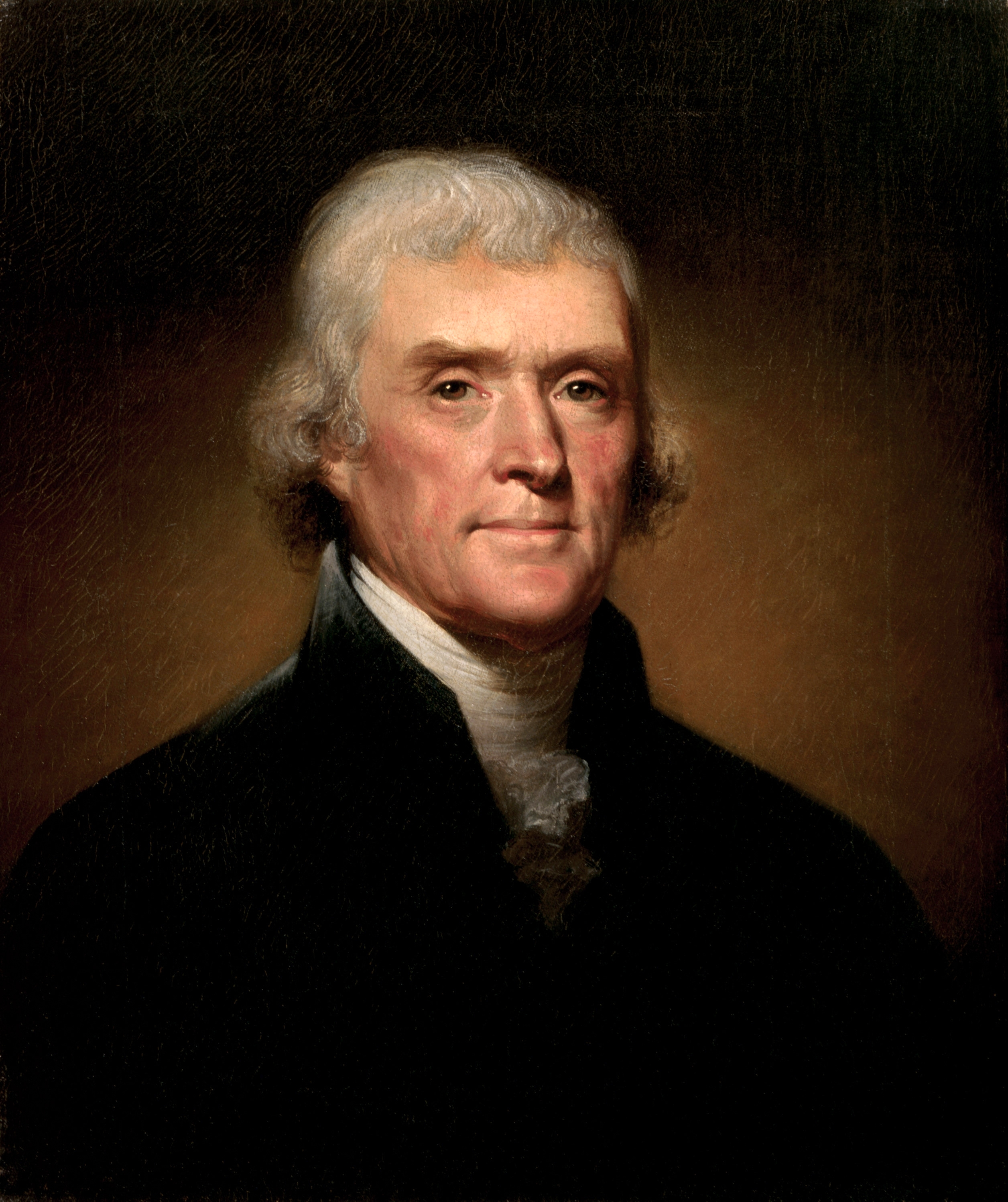
After inauguration, President Thomas Jefferson removed almost half all federal appointed officials.

The Federalist Party and the Democratic-Republican Party comprised the First Party System in the United States. Democratic-Republican Thomas Jefferson defeated Federalist John Adams in the 1800 presidential election. Jefferson's party also took control of Congress in the House and Senate elections. After the elections, the lame duck Federalist administration passed the Judiciary Act of 1801 (the "Midnight Judges Act"), creating 16 new circuit judgeships to preside in the circuit courts (as opposed to the district judges and the Supreme Court justices riding circuit). Along with the District of Columbia Organic Act of 1801 (the "Organic Act"), the statutes created many judicial vacancies, and Adams filled nearly all of these judgeships on his last day in office. Marshall, in his dual role as Adams' Secretary of State, failed to deliver some of these commissions before leaving office.

=== Companion cases ===
Immediately after his inauguration, Jefferson instructed his Secretary of State, James Madison, to stop delivery on all outstanding commissions. Further, an act of March 8, 1802 abolished the circuit court judgeships created by the Midnight Judges Act (15 of which had already been filled), restoring the system created under the 1789 and 1793 acts. Federalists viewed this as unconstitutional and looked to the then-pending case of Marbury v. Madison—concerning a confirmed D.C. justice of the peace who had not received his commission—as a test case for the constitutionality of the repeal. The next session of the Supreme Court was in June, one month before the repeal would take effect. But, the Judiciary Act of 1802 delayed the Court's next session until February 1803, and made other changes to the structure of the judicial system.

More broadly, Jefferson removed 146 of 316 (46%) incumbent, second-level, appointed federal officials, including 13 U.S. Attorneys and 18 U.S. Marshals. Jefferson also displaced two district judges—Ray Greene and Jacob Read—citing technical flaws in their appointments. Further, District Judge John Pickering was impeached and removed from office on a party-line vote. The following day, the House impeached Justice Samuel Chase, but six Democratic-Republicans crossed party lines in the Senate to prevent his conviction by a single vote.

In Marbury, the Supreme Court held that Madison's failure to deliver the commission to Marbury was illegal, but did not grant Marbury a writ of mandamus on the ground that § 13 of the Judiciary Act of 1789 was unconstitutional insofar as it authorized the Court to issue such writs under its original jurisdiction. Stuart v. Laird—involving a civil judgment rendered by a circuit court constituted under the Midnight Judges Act and enforced by a circuit court constituted under the Judiciary Act of 1802—challenged the constitutionality both of abolishing the circuit judgeships and of requiring the Supreme Court justices to ride circuit. In a brief opinion, the Court rejected both challenges.

=== District of Columbia Organic Act of 1801 ===
Both the United States Circuit Court of the District of Columbia and the D.C. justices of the peace were created on February 27, 1801 by the District of Columbia Organic Act of 1801. Unlike its better-known predecessor, the Midnight Judges Act, the Organic Act survived repeal by the Jeffersonian Congress.

==== D.C. justices of the peace ====
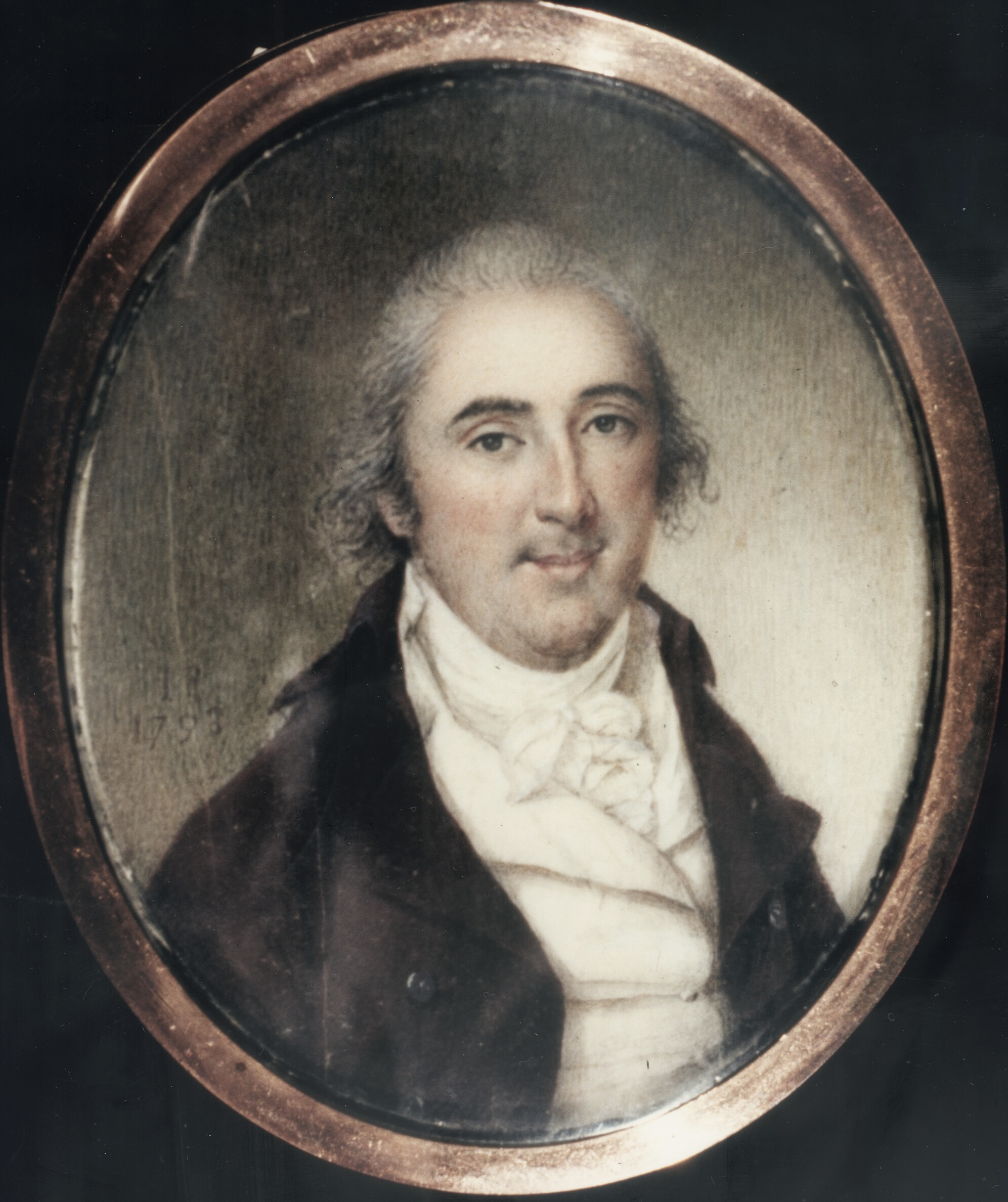
President Jefferson refused to deliver commissions to some of President Adams' confirmed D.C. justice of the peace nominees, like William Marbury (pictured).

The D.C. justices of the peace were appointed by the President, in a number at his discretion, and confirmed by the Senate for five-year terms. A D.C. justice of the peace had jurisdiction over "all matters, civil and criminal, and in whatever relates to the conservation of the peace" within their county. The District of Columbia was divided into two counties: Washington County, east of the Potomac River, and Alexandria County, west of the Potomac. Justices of the peace were authorized to "inflict whipping, imprisonment, and fine as high as 500 pounds of tobacco" and to hear civil cases with an amount in controversy up to $20. One year after More, in Ex parte Burford (1806), the Marshall Court's first original habeas case, the Court granted a writ of habeas corpus to a prisoner subjected to preventive detention by the D.C. justices of the peace.

As to compensation, the Organic Act provided that justices of the peace "shall be entitled to receive for their services the fees allowed for like services by the laws herein before adopted and continued, in the eastern part of said district." A March 3, 1801 amendment to the Organic Act provided that: "[T]he magistrates, to be appointed for the said district, shall be and they are hereby constituted a board of commissioners within their respective counties, and shall possess and exercise the same powers, perform the same duties, receive the same fees and emoulments [sic?], as the levy courts or commissioners of county for the state of Maryland possess, perform and receive . . . ."

On March 4, 1801, President John Adams's last day in office, Adams nominated and the Senate confirmed 20 D.C. justices of the peace for Washington County and 19 for Alexandria County. On March 16, President Thomas Jefferson issued 15 commissions to justices of the peace in Washington County, including 13 nominated by Adams, and 15 in Alexandria County, including 11 nominated by Adams; the remainder were of his own choosing. (Jefferson's list, submitted to the Senate on January 6, 1802, erroneously contained the name of John Laird, a confirmed Adams appointed who had not received a commission from Jefferson, instead of More.) The plaintiffs in Marbury v. Madison (1803)—William Marbury, Dennis Ramsay, Robert Townsend Hooe, and William Harper—were among the confirmed Adams nominees not commissioned.

On May 3, 1802, Congress eliminated both the fees for justice of the peace services, except travel expenses, authorized by the Organic Act and fees associated with the justices of the peace's role on the board of commissioners. These two sources represented the entirety of their compensation.

==== D.C. circuit court ====
The three-judge United States Circuit Court of the District of Columbia was populated by its own judges, rather than by a mixture of district judges and circuit riding Supreme Court justices like the other circuit courts. The D.C. circuit court had jurisdiction over crimes committed within the district. With regard to appeals from the D.C. circuit court, the Organic Act provided:

[A]ny final judgment, order or decree in said circuit court, wherein the matter in dispute, exclusive of costs, shall exceed the value of one hundred dollars, may be re-examined and reversed or affirmed in the supreme court of the United States, by writ of error or appeal, which shall be prosecuted in the same manner, under the same regulations, and the same proceedings shall be had therein, as is or shall be provided in the case of writs of error on judgments, or appeals upon orders or decrees, rendered in the circuit court of the United States.

The provision to which the Organic Act referred, that for writs of error from the circuit courts to the Supreme Court in the Judiciary Act of 1789, provided:

And upon a like process [as a writ of error from the district court to the circuit court], may final judgments and decrees in civil actions, and suits in equity in a circuit court, brought there by original process, or removed there from courts of the several States, or removed there by appeal from a district court where the matter in dispute exceeds the sum or value of two thousand dollars, exclusive of costs, be re-examined and reversed or affirmed in the Supreme Court, the citation being in such case signed by a judge of such circuit court, or justice of the Supreme Court, and the adverse party having at least thirty days’ notice.

Unlike the appellate provision of the Judiciary Act of 1789, the appellate provision of the act of February 27, 1801 was not explicitly limited to civil cases (except insofar as it incorporated the former by reference). Further, because the D.C. circuit court was not constituted within the framework of the Judiciary Act of 1802, appeals to the Supreme Court by way of certificates of division could not issue. After More, the Marshall Court heard six appeals from the D.C. circuit court via original habeas.

=== Criminal appeals ===
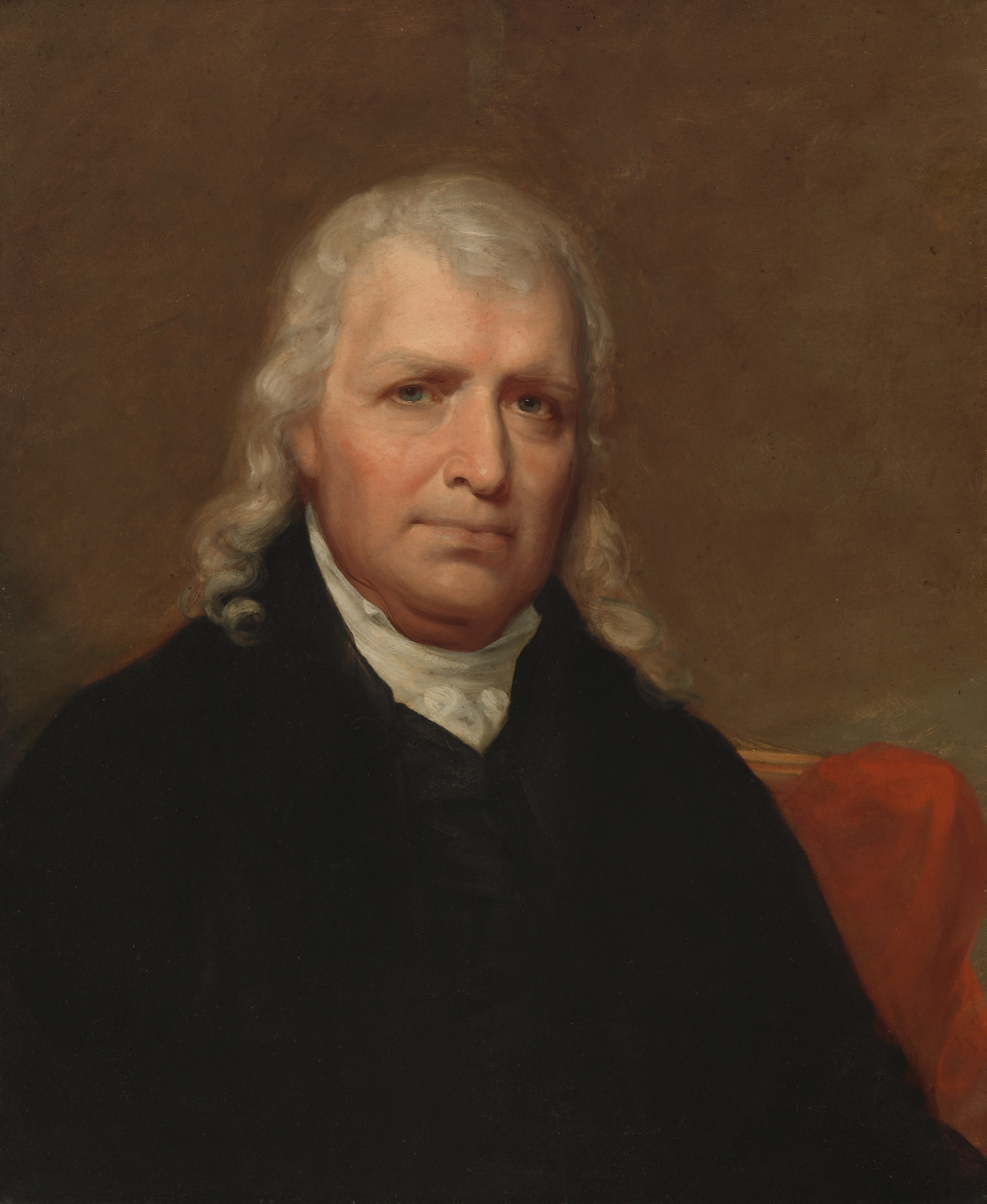
Justice Samuel Chase expressed his willingness to sign a writ of error in a criminal case while riding circuit in 1800.

The availability of criminal appeals to the Supreme Court by means of writs of error from the circuit courts was perhaps an open question prior to More. In England, the writ of error was available as of right in misdemeanor cases, but, in felony cases, required the express consent of the prosecutor.

The legislative history of the Judiciary Act of 1789 reveals little consideration of criminal appeals. Caleb Strong, a Senator at the time of its drafting, described § 22 of that act as follows: "Writs of Error from the Circuit to the Supr. Court in all Causes not criminal of which the Circuit Court has original Cognizance and the Matter in Dispute does not exceed 2000 Dolrs." Senator (and future Supreme Court justice) William Paterson noticed the lack of provision for criminal appeals in preliminary notes and a draft outline of a speech he gave on June 23, 1789. According to Rossman, Paterson may have viewed the inability of the government to appeal (to a court in the nation's capitol) as a "protection for ordinary citizens." The issue of criminal appeals was not mentioned in the House debates.

Shortly after the Judiciary Act of 1789 took effect, Attorney General Edmund Randolph proposed, in a report to the House of Representatives, a criminal appeal similar to that in England: a writ of error as of right in non-capital cases, and no writs of error in capital cases. Randolph's report was referred to the Committee of the Whole, which took no action.

Prior to Marshall's tenure, the Supreme Court had heard only two criminal cases—both by prerogative writ. First, in United States v. Hamilton (1795), the Court granted bail to a capital defendant—as it was authorized to do by § 33 of the Judiciary Act of 1789 and § 4 of the Judiciary Act of 1793. The greater portion of the decision was dedicated to the Court's refusal to order the case tried by a special circuit court, as was provided for by § 3 of the Judiciary Act of 1793. In Ex parte Bollman (1807), the Court explained that its jurisdiction in Hamilton could only have been exercised via original habeas under § 14 of the Judiciary Act of 1789. Second, in United States v. Lawrence (1795), the Court declined to issue a writ of mandamus to compel a district judge to order the arrest of a deserter of the French navy. In one criminal trial, United States v. Callender (C.C.D. Va. 1800), Justice Samuel Chase (who expressed no dissent in More) wrote:

[I]f I am not right, it is an error in judgment, and you can state the proceedings on the record so as to show any error, and I shall be the first man to grant you the benefit a new trial by granting you a writ of error in the supreme court.

In United States v. Simms (1803), the Court heard a writ of error, brought by the United States, on the merits from a criminal case in the D.C. circuit court. Simms was the first such case, and after Simms, the next criminal writ of error heard by the Court was More. U.S. Attorney for the District of Columbia John T. Mason argued both Simms and More.

== Indictments ==
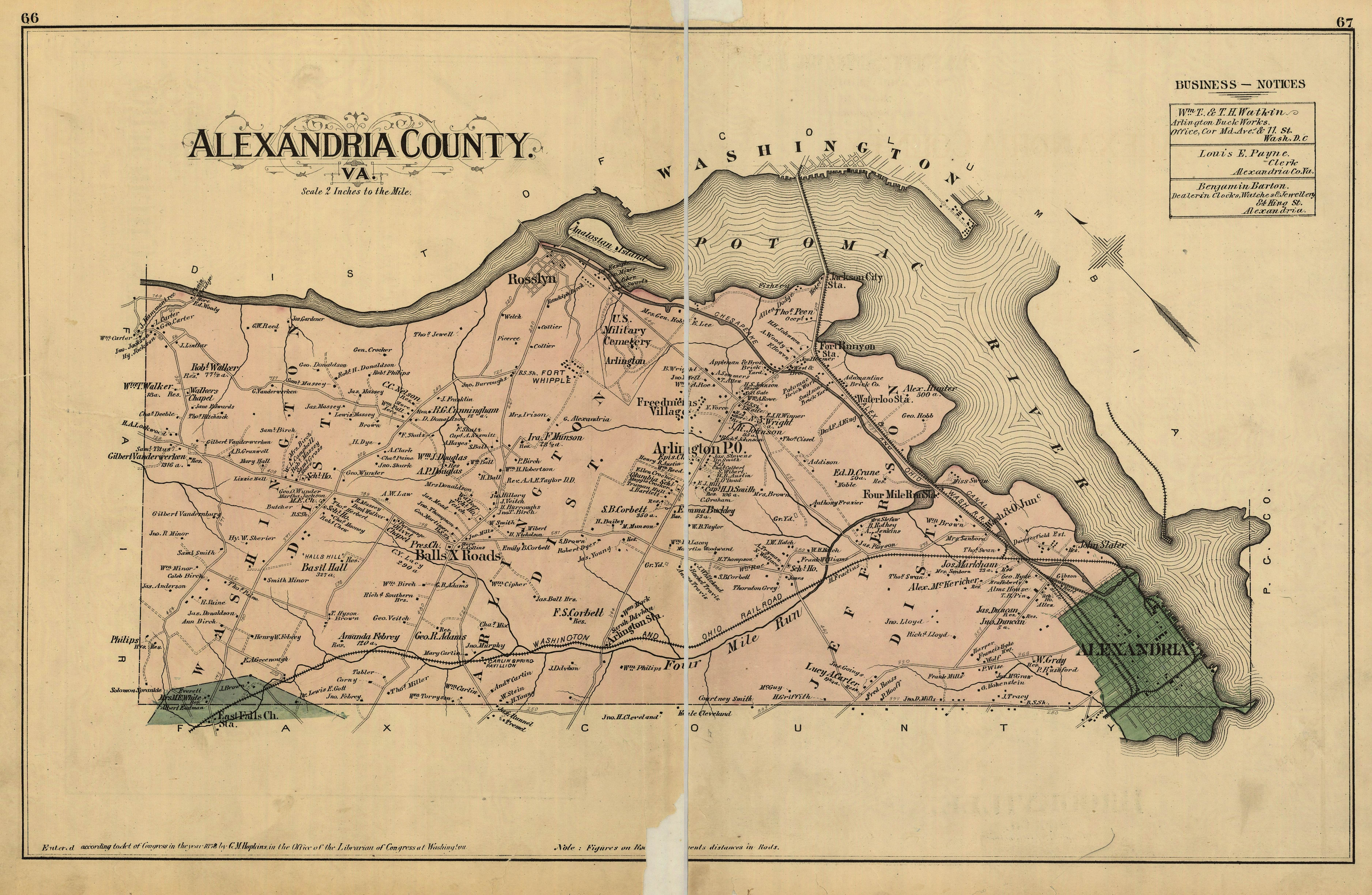
Because the law of Virginia remained in force in Alexandria County, More was indicted for the common law crime of exacting illegal fees under color of his office.

Benjamin More was one of two of D.C. justices of peace in Alexandria County of Jefferson's own choosing, receiving an interim appointment. Jefferson proceeded to nominate More for a full five-year term, and the Senate confirmed More on April 27, 1802. According to O'Fallon, "More appears to have been a man of moderate Jeffersonian sentiments and attachments, who nonetheless joined in a Federalist defense of judicial independence." He was "an unlikely character for the lead role in a Federalist attack on Jeffersonian principles." O'Fallon hypothesizes that More's case was intended as a test case by all parties involved. "More has all the markings of a trumped-up case, manufactured to present the Supreme Court with the issues of principle raised by the repeal, without the embarrassment of direct conflict with the Executive."

More was indicted by the Grand Inquest for the County of Washington, during its July term, for taking unlawful fees for his services as a justice of the peace. The indictment charged More with having taken the fees on July 17 and 24. A capias, returnable at the December 1802 term, was issued. The members of the Inquest included five other D.C. justices of the peace: Daniel Carrol, Daniel Reintzell, Joseph Sprigg Belt, Thomas Corcoran, and Anthony Reintzell. Another member of the Inquest was Thomas Beall, a confirmed Adams appointee who had not received a commission from Jefferson.

More was indicted a second time at the December term for conduct on December 10, 1802. More demured, and the case was continued until the July 1803 term. Only the latter indictment was mentioned in the United States Reports.

More's demurrer was opposed by U.S. Attorney Mason, a Jefferson appointee. Mason argued that the D.C. justices of the peace were Article I judges established pursuant to Congress's enumerated power over the District of Columbia in Article One of the United States Constitution. Article One provides that Congress shall have power "[t]o exercise exclusive Legislation in all Cases whatsoever, over such District (not exceeding ten Miles square) as may, by Cession of particular States, and the Acceptance of Congress, become the Seat of the Government of the United States." Mason advanced a broad view that Congress's power over the District of Columbia was not limited by any other constitutional provision. In support of his argument that the justices of the peace were not Article III judges, Mason argued that their jurisdiction was broader than that permitted by Article III.

According to O'Fallon, there were additional indicia—not cited by either party—that the justices of the peace were not Article III judges. For example, the Organic Act authorized the President to appoint as many justices of the peace as he "shall from time to time think expedient." This was a broad delegation to the President of Congress's power "[t]o constitute Tribunals inferior to the supreme Court."

More was not indicted under any criminal statue passed by Congress. Rather, his was "an indictment at common law . . . for having, under colour of his office, exacted and taken an illegal fee." The Organic Act provided that the laws of Maryland and Virginia would continue in force in the portions of the district ceded from those states. Since More was a justice of the peace for Alexandria County, the common law of Virginia would have applied.

== Dismissal ==
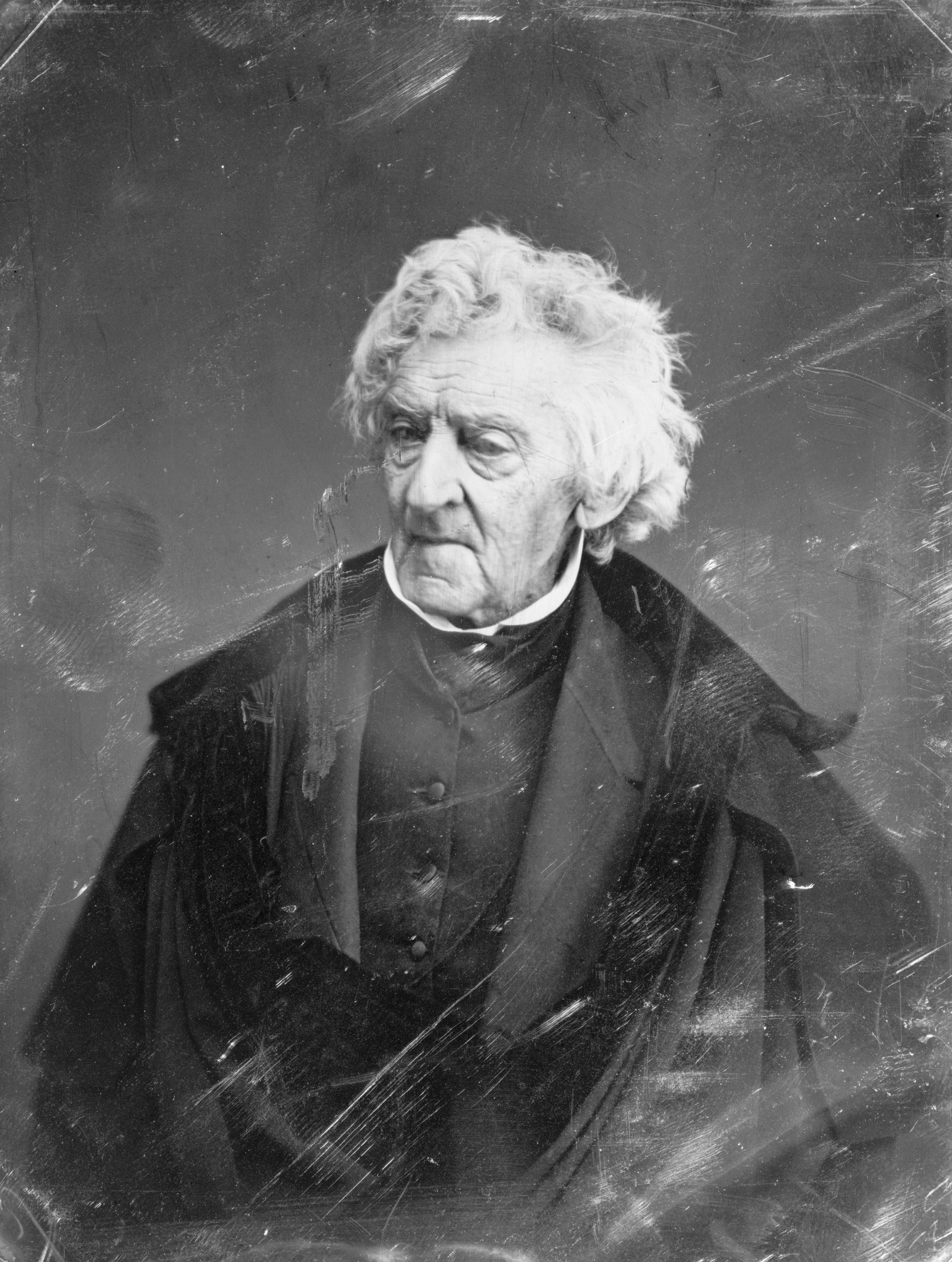
William Cranch both heard the case as a D.C. circuit court judge and reported the Supreme Court's decision.

The D.C. circuit court judges hearing the demurrer were Chief Judge William Kilty and assistant judges William Cranch and James Markham Marshall (Chief Justice John Marshall's brother). Cranch and Marshall were Adams appointees; Kilty was a Jefferson appointee. Cranch, also the reporter of decisions for the Supreme Court, included the D.C. circuit court opinions in the margin of his report of the Supreme Court's decision in More.

=== Majority ===
Cranch, joined by Marshall, sustained More's demurrer based on the Compensation Clause of Article Three of the United States Constitution. That clause provides: "The Judges, both of the supreme and inferior Courts . . . shall, at stated Times, receive for their Services a Compensation which shall not be diminished during their Continuance in Office."

Cranch held that Congress's power over the federal district was limited by the remainder of the Constitution. In response to Mason's argument for unfettered power, Cranch replied: "[T]his is a doctrine to which I can never assent. Can it be said, that congress may pass a bill of attainder for the district of Columbia? That congress may pass laws ex post facto in the district, or order soldiers to be quartered upon us in a time of peace, or make our ports free ports of entry, or lay duties upon our exports, or take away the right of trial by jury, in criminal prosecutions?"

Cranch held that More was an Article III judge sitting on a "Tribunal inferior to the supreme Court." In response to the argument that his jurisdiction exceeded Article Three, Cranch replied that: "The causes of which they have cognizance, are causes arising under the laws of the United States, and, therefore, the power of trying them, is part of the judicial power . . . ." In response to the argument that the fees would never have been paid at a "time Stated," Cranch replied that: "[I]t may, perhaps, be a compliance with the clause of the constitution, which requires that it shall be receivable at stated times, to say that it shall be paid when the service is rendered. And, we are rather to incline to this construction, than to suppose the command of the constitution to have been disobeyed." Further, Cranch dodged the question of whether a five-year term was consistent with the Good Behavior Clause. "It is unnecessary in this cause to decide the question, whether, as such, he holds his office during good behaviour . . . ."

Cranch stopped short of declaring the statute unconstitutional. He merely interpreted it as prospective, holding that it "cannot affect that justice of the peace during his continuance in office; whatever effect it may have upon those justices who have been appointed to office since the passing of the act." Contemporary media accounts reported that the circuit court had held that fee-elimination provision of the May 23, 1802 act unconstitutional, rather than interpreting it as prospective. According to O'Fallon, this is evidence that Cranch's published opinion (as reported by himself) may have differed from his oral opinion.

=== Dissent ===
Chief Judge Kilty's dissent noted the recent confirmation of the principle of judicial review in Marbury v. Madison. "According to the course which has been pursued by the supreme court, it appears unnecessary to say any thing about the power of a court to examine into the constitutionality of a law . . . ." Instead, Kilty proceeded by "taking the power for granted." But, Kilty noted, "[i]n testing an act of the legislature by the constitution, nothing less than the positive provisions of the latter can be resorted to . . . ."

Kilty briefly argued that More was not an Article III judge and that the fees in question were not compensation received at "times Stated." But, the bulk of Kilty's dissent was devoted to the argument that Congress's power over the federal district was broad. He argued that "the district of Columbia, though belonging to the United States, and within their compass, is not, like a state, a component part, and that the provisions of the constitution, which are applicable particularly to the relative situation of the United States and the several states, are not applicable to this district." "[W]hen congress, in exercising exclusive legislation over this territory, enact laws to give or to take away the fees of the justices of the peace, such laws cannot be tested by a provision in the constitution, evidently applicable to the judicial power of the whole United States, and containing restrictions which cannot, in their nature, affect the situation of the justices, or the nature of the compensation."

Yet, Kilty did not fully accept Mason's argument that Congress's power over the district was unlimited. He argued that the word "exclusive" meant only "free from the power exercised by the several states" and that "the legislative power to be exercised by congress may still be subject to the general restraints contained in the constitution." He admitted that, even within the federal district, Congress was

restrained from suspending the writ of habeas corpus, unless in the cases allowed; from passing (within and for the district) a bill of attainder, or ex post facto law; from laying therein a capitation tax; from granting therein any title of nobility; from making therein a law respecting the establishment of religion, or abridging the freedom of speech, or of the press; and from quartering soldiers therein, contrary to the third amendment.

== Oral argument ==
Mason argued the appeal of the United States before the Supreme Court. Samuel Jones argued for More.

=== Merits ===
Jones cited Marbury v. Madison for the proposition that a D.C. justice of the peace does not serve merely at the pleasure of the president. According to O'Fallon, due to the President's power to remove most appointees from office, this could only have been a reference to the Good Behavior Clause of Article Three. That clause provides that "Judges, both of the supreme and inferior Courts, shall hold their Offices during good Behavior." Mason countered that Marbury only held that justices of the peace were entitled to hold their offices for five years of good behavior.

Mason again pressed his argument that Congress's power of the federal district was unlimited:

The constitution does not apply to this case. The constitution is a compact between the people of the United States in their individual capacity, and the states in their political capacity. Unfortunately for the citizens of Columbia, they are not in either of these capacities. . . . Congress are under no controul in legislating for the district of Columbia. Their power, in this respect, is unlimited.

Marson also argued that More was not an Article III judge because "the judicial power exercised in the district of Columbia, extends to other cases [than those enumerated in Article III], and, therefore, is not the judicial power of the United States." "It is a power derived from the power given to congress to legislate exclusively in all cases whatsoever over the district."

=== Jurisdiction ===
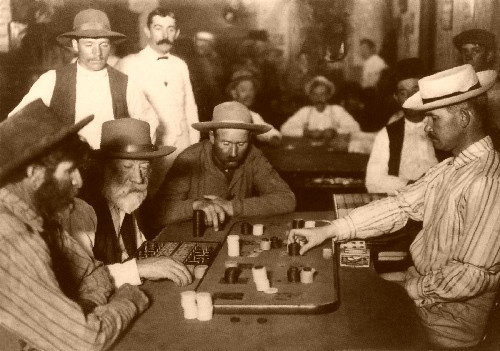
Just two years earlier, in United States v. Simms (1803), the Court had heard a criminal appeal from the same court concerning faro gambling (pictured).

On February 13, sua sponte, Chief Justice Marshall raised his doubts to the Court's jurisdiction to entertain criminal appeals. Argument on this question commenced on February 22. Mason argued in favor of jurisdiction. No argument from More's counsel on this issue was reported, "although it was typical for the reporter to summarize the arguments on both sides."

Mason acknowledged that, under Clarke v. Bazadone (1803), the Supreme Court's appellate jurisdiction required an affirmative grant by Congress. Mason argued that such a grant was found in § 14 of the Judiciary Act of 1789 (known as the All Writs Act), which authorized the Supreme Court to "issue writs of scire facias, habeas corpus, and all other writs, not specially provided for by statute, which may be necessary for the exercise of [its] jurisdiction, and agreeable to the principles and usages of law." Mason's argument based on the All Writs Act was not necessarily limited to the D.C. circuit court. Said Mason:

There is no reason why the writ of error should be confined to civil cases. A man's life, his liberty, and his good name, are as dear to him as his property; and inferior courts are as liable to err in one case as in the other. There is nothing in the nature of the cases which should make a difference; nor is it a novel doctrine that a writ of error should lie in a criminal case. They have been frequent in that country from which we have drawn almost all our forms of judicial proceedings.

Chief Justice Marshall replied that, if Congress had made no provision for appeals of any kind to the Supreme Court, "your argument would be irresistible." But, Marshall countered, under the Exceptions Clause, when Congress "has said in what cases a writ of error or appeal shall lie, an exception of all other cases is implied." The Exceptions Clause provides that "[i]n all [cases other than those in which the Supreme Court has original jurisdiction], the supreme Court shall have appellate Jurisdiction, both as to Law and Fact, with such Exceptions, and under such Regulations as the Congress shall make."

Mason replied, first, that the Exceptions Clause did not apply to the federal district, and second, that Organic Act differed from the Judiciary Act of 1789 by referring to "any final judgment, order, or decree," rather than explicitly limiting appeals to "civil cases." Mason suggested that the references to the amount in controversy could refer to criminal fines as well as civil judgments. Finally, Mason pointed out that, just two years earlier, in United States v. Simms (1803), the Court had reached the merits in a criminal appeal from the same court. Mason himself had argued Simms, and Marshall himself had authored the opinion.

In response to the last point, Marshall replied that: "No question was made, in that case, as to the jurisdiction. It passed sub silentio, and the court does not consider itself as bound by that case." Mason retorted: "But the traverser [Simms] had able counsel, who did not think proper to make the objection."

== Opinion ==
Chief Justice John Marshall dismissed the writ of error for want of jurisdiction.

On March 2, 1805, writing for a unanimous Court, Chief Justice John Marshall dismissed the writ of error for want of jurisdiction. Justice Johnson was absent from the opinion announcement.

Marshall held that the partial statutory grant of appellate jurisdiction to the Court operated as an exercise of Congress's power under the Exceptions Clause to limit the jurisdiction of the Court in all other cases. Marshall noted that "it has never been supposed, that a decision of a circuit court could be reviewed, unless the matter in dispute should exceed the value of 2,000 dollars." Thus, Marshall interpreted the $2000 amount in controversy requirement of § 22 of the Judiciary Act of 1789 as applying to the entire section, rather than only the last antecedent.

Marshall rejected the argument that the Organic Act authorized criminal appellate jurisdiction. He interpreted the grant, in light of its $100 amount in controversy requirement, as "confined to civil cases." "The words, 'matter in dispute,' seem appropriated to civil cases, where the subject in contest has a value beyond the sum mentioned in the act. But, in criminal cases, the question is the guilt or innocence of the accused. And although he may be fined upwards of 100 dollars, yet that is, in the eye of the law, a punishment for the offence committed, and not the particular object of the suit."

A final footnote refers to United States v. La Vengeance (1796), "where it seems to be admitted, that in criminal cases the judgment of the inferior court is final." La Vengeance was an admiralty libel case. There, at oral argument, Attorney General Charles Lee argued, in the alternative, that the case was a "criminal cause" and therefore "should never have been removed to the Circuit Court, the judgment of the District Court being final in criminal causes." The Court summarily rejected Lee's argument: "we are unanimously of opinion, that it is a civil cause: It is a process of the nature of a libel in rem; and does not, in any degree, touch the persons of the offender."

== Aftermath ==
After More, no writs of error issued from federal criminal trials in the circuit courts for 84 years. In 1889, Congress created a right of appeal by writ of error in capital cases. In 1891, the Judiciary Act of 1891 (the "Evarts Act") extended this right to other serious crimes. The Judicial Code of 1911 abolished the circuit courts and placed original jurisdiction for the trial of all federal crimes in the district courts. Appeal to the courts of appeals by writs of error was provided for all "final decisions," in civil and criminal cases alike. Appeals to the Supreme Court were permitted directly from the district courts by writ of error, from the courts of appeals on certified questions, and by petition for certiorari. Without reported discussion of the jurisdictional issue, the Court did hear writs of error from criminal cases removed to the circuit courts. (Recall that the Judiciary Act of 1789 explicitly authorized appeals in removal cases.)

The Supreme Court had other, limited sources of appellate jurisdiction in criminal cases. The Court could hear criminal appeals from the state courts by writ of error, as authorized by the Judiciary Act of 1789. The Court could hear federal criminal appeals by certificate of division, as authorized by the Judiciary Act of 1802, original habeas petition, as authorized by the Judiciary Act of 1789, and mandamus, as authorized by the same act. Between 1867 and 1868, and after 1885, the Court had jurisdiction to hear writs of error from habeas petitions (a civil action) in the circuit courts. Beginning in 1850, the Court also entertained such appeals from the territorial courts. Attempts to utilize other prerogative writs as sources of jurisdiction were unsuccessful.

== Analysis ==
More had received far less scholarly attention than Marbury. "The timing and the ground of decision may explain why historians of the battle over repeal have ignored More." "In a doctrinal summary of constitutional law, More stands only for the proposition that an affirmative grant of appellate jurisdiction by Congress carries with it an implicit negative of jurisdiction within the constitutional description but not mentioned in the grant."

According to O'Fallon, "More may have been part of a Federalist strategy to get the Court to intervene in the political struggle over the judiciary." Given that Justice Samuel Chase was acquitted by the Senate in his impeachment case on March 1, 1805, the day before the release of the More decision, "[o]ne can imagine John Marshall passing a sigh of relief as he handed down the judgment in More." "[T]he dismissal of More marked the end of Federalist efforts to obtain a Supreme Court ruling, directly or by implication, that the repeal of the 1801 Judiciary Act was unconstitutional. "More is of a piece with Marbury and Stuart v. Laird in its avoidance of an opportunity for an open clash with political critics of the courts. It further shares with Marbury the characteristic of declining an exercise of jurisdiction that the Court found to be unwarranted." O'Fallon argues:

Rather than seize the opportunity presented by More, John Marshall ducked. . . . Without questioning the soundness or propriety of Marshall's decision, it is worth noting that the Court had previously entertained criminal appeals from the district without raising any such jurisdictional problem. One might reasonably wonder if the Court wanted to avoid a decision on the merits. By March of 1805, the repeal question had lost its political immediacy, and the impeachment strategy of the Jeffersonians had faltered. There was little to be gained in reopening the sores of the repeal battle. And Marshall may have felt that he had had his say on the critical matters of principle with his opinion in Marbury.
