= District of Columbia home rule =

Autonomous rule in the District of Columbia, in the United States

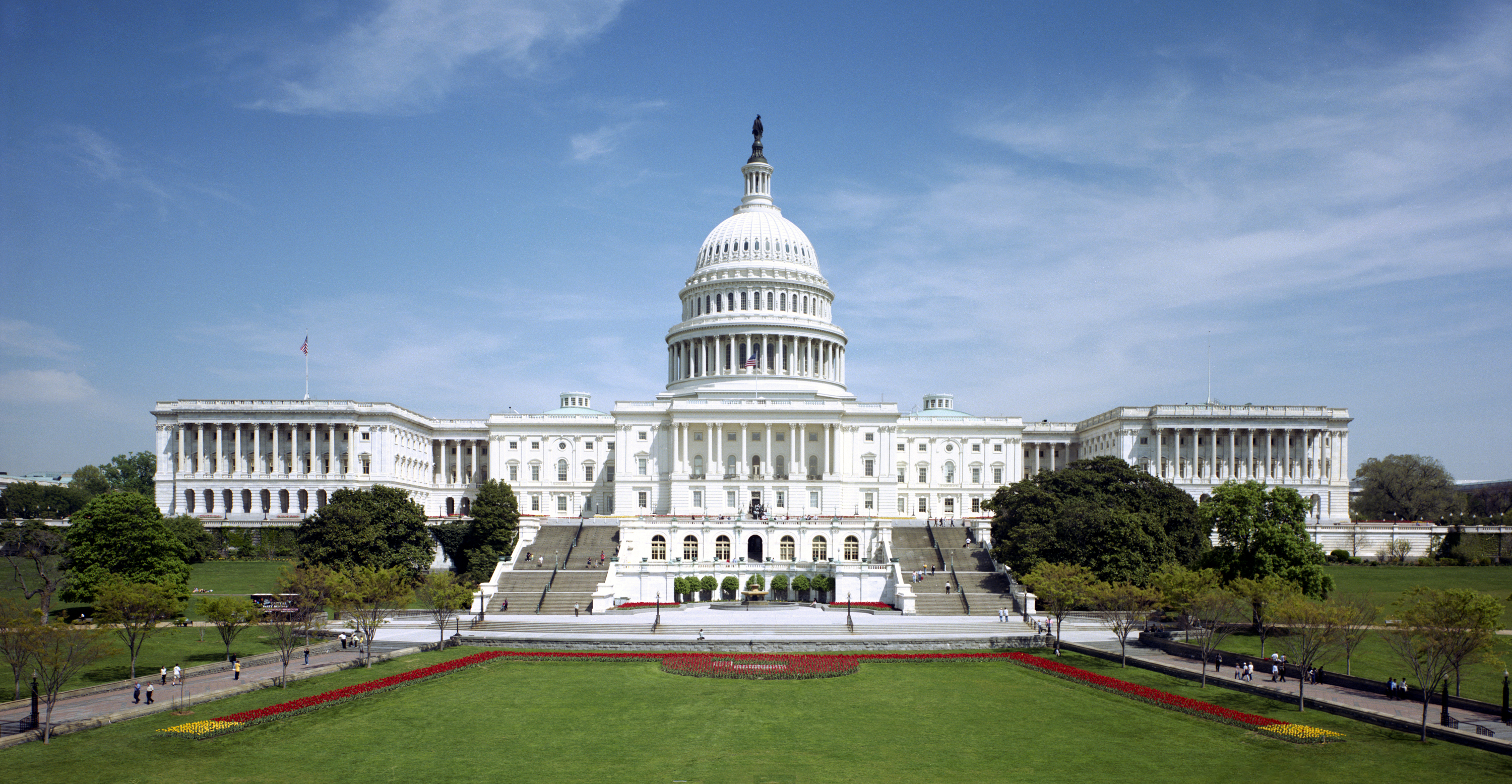
The United States Congress has ultimate authority over the District.

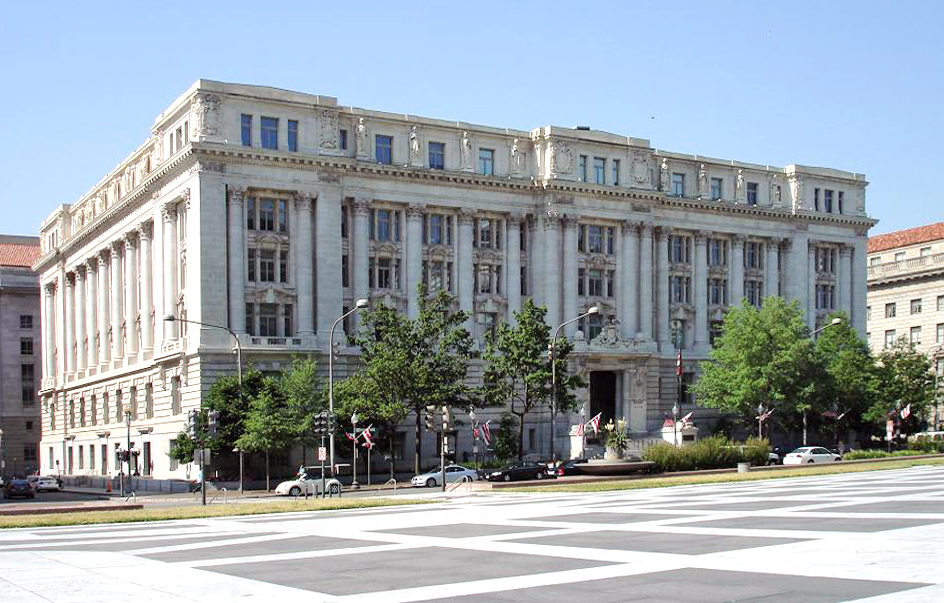
The John A. Wilson Building is home to the mayor and the 13 members of the Council of the District of Columbia.

District of Columbia home rule is the District of Columbia residents' ability to govern their local affairs. The District is a federal district; as such, the Constitution grants the United States Congress exclusive jurisdiction over the District in "all cases whatsoever".

Before 1874 and since 1973, Congress has allowed certain powers of government to be carried out by locally elected officials. However, Congress maintains the power to overturn local laws and exercises greater oversight of the district than exists for any U.S. state. Furthermore, the District's elected government exists under the grace of Congress and could theoretically be revoked at any time.

A separate yet related controversy is the District's lack of voting representation in Congress. The district's unique status creates a situation where District of Columbia residents have neither complete control over their local government nor voting representation in the body with complete control.

In 2015, the District of Columbia became a member of the Unrepresented Nations and Peoples Organization.

== Constitutional provisions ==
James Madison explained the need for a federal district on January 23, 1788, in the Federalist No. 43, arguing that the national capital needed to be distinct from the states, in order to provide for its own maintenance and safety. An attack on the Congress at Philadelphia by a mob of angry soldiers, known as the Pennsylvania Mutiny of 1783, had emphasized the need for the government to see to its own security. Therefore, the authority to establish a federal capital was provided in Article I, Section 8 of the United States Constitution, which states that Congress shall have the power:

To exercise exclusive Legislation in all Cases whatsoever, over such District (not exceeding ten Miles square) as may, by Cession of particular States, and the acceptance of Congress, become the Seat of the Government of the United States

The phrase "exclusive legislation in all Cases whatsoever" has been interpreted to mean that Congress is the ultimate authority over the District, thereby limiting local self-government by the District of Columbia's residents. However, the Founding Fathers envisioned that Congress would devolve some of this power to the local level. For example, Madison stated in the Federalist No. 43 that "a municipal legislature for local purposes, derived from their own suffrages, will of course be allowed them."

== History of self-government ==
On July 16, 1790, the Residence Act provided for a new permanent capital to be located on the Potomac River, the exact area to be selected by President Washington. As permitted by the U.S. Constitution, the initial shape of the federal district was a square, measuring 10 miles (16 km) on each side, totaling 100 square miles (260 km^{2}). The Residence Act also provided for the selection of a three-member board of commissioners, appointed by the President, charged with overseeing the construction of the new capital.

Two other incorporated cities that predated the establishment of the District were also included within the new federal territory: Georgetown, founded in 1751, and the City of Alexandria, Virginia, founded in 1749. A new "federal city" called the City of Washington was under construction, partly habitable, on the north bank of the Potomac, to the east of the established settlement at Georgetown.

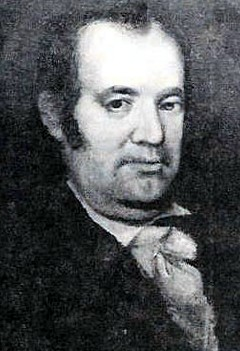
Robert Brent, first mayor of the City of Washington

The Organic Act of 1801 officially organized the District of Columbia and placed the entire federal district under the exclusive control of Congress.

At its formation, the District consisted of five political subdivisions: the three cities of Washington, Georgetown, and Alexandria, and the unincorporated rural sections organized into two counties: Washington County, D.C. to the east of the Potomac and the Alexandria County, D.C. to the west. It included all of the present Arlington County plus part of what is now the independent city of Alexandria. The respective laws of Maryland and Virginia were declared still in force.

In 1802, the board of commissioners was disbanded, and the City of Washington was officially incorporated. The city's incorporation allowed for a local municipal government consisting of a mayor appointed by the President and two branches of a city council, popularly elected. The local colonial-era governments of Georgetown and Alexandria were also left intact. As such, the citizens of Georgetown retained their popularly elected mayor, as did the City of Alexandria. In 1812, the council was given the power to elect the mayor of the City of Washington. In 1820, the Congress granted the City of Washington a new charter, which allowed for a mayor popularly elected by voters.

The disputes became more political in 1840 when the city elected a member of the anti-Jackson Whig Party as mayor. Two weeks after the election, members of Congress submitted legislation to alter the charter of the City of Washington to remove the city's elected government. However, the bill was unable to pass the Congress due to disputes among members about the status of slavery in the District. The election of President William Henry Harrison, who was favorable to residents of the District, assured that the proposed bill would not become law.

On July 9, 1846, in response to a voter referendum, Congress retroceded the City of Alexandria and Alexandria County to Virginia.

In the years preceding and during the American Civil War, the District developed a complicated, piecemeal government. Three distinct authorities over Washington County and the two cities, Washington and Georgetown, remained intact. In 1861, as the first step toward political consolidation, those three bodies were granted shared authority over the new Metropolitan Police Department, founded to enforce the law throughout the District. Its oversight board of five commissioners named by the President included one representing Georgetown, one from the county of Washington, and three from the city of Washington.

During the Civil War, the district experienced a large increase in its population; by 1870, the District's population had grown to nearly 132,000. Despite the district's growth, District still had dirt roads and lacked basic sanitation; the situation was so bad that some members of Congress proposed moving the capital elsewhere.

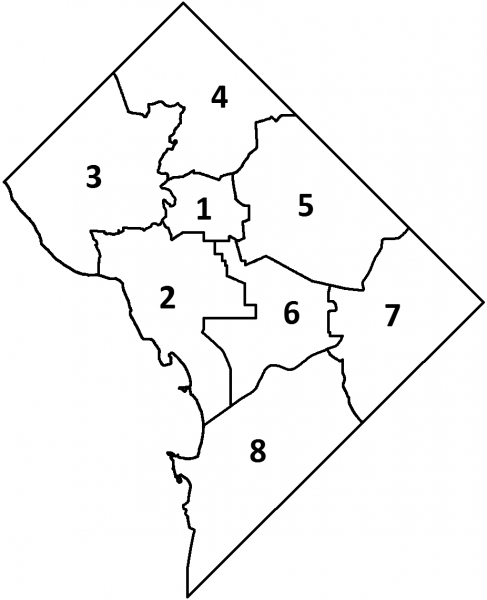
Each of the district's eight wards is further divided into local Advisory Neighborhood Commissions.

To facilitate infrastructure improvements and make the district's government operate more efficiently, Congress passed the Organic Act of 1871, which created a new government for the entire federal district. This Act effectively combined the City of Washington, Georgetown, and the unincorporated area known then as Washington County into a single district government for the whole District of Columbia. In the same Organic Act, Congress created a territorial government which consisted of a legislative assembly with an upper house composed of eleven council members appointed by the President and a 22-member house of delegates elected by the people, as well as an appointed Board of Public Works charged with modernizing the district. In 1873, President Ulysses S. Grant appointed the board's most influential member, Alexander Robey Shepherd, to the new post of governor. Shepherd authorized large-scale projects to modernize the District of Columbia but spent three times the approved budget, bankrupting the district.

In 1874, Congress abolished the District's local government in favor of direct rule. The territorial government was replaced by a three-member Board of Commissioners, consisting of two members appointed by the President with the approval of the Senate, and a third member selected from the United States Army Corps of Engineers, with one of the three members selected to act as President of the Board. This form of government continued for nearly a century. Between 1948 and 1966, six bills were introduced in Congress to provide some form of home rule, but none ever passed.

In 1967, President Lyndon Johnson presented to Congress a plan to reorganize the District's government designed by David Carliner. The three-commissioner system was replaced by a government headed by a single mayor-commissioner, an assistant mayor-commissioner, and a nine-member district council, all appointed by the president. The mayor-commissioner and his assistant served four-year terms, while the council served three-year terms. While the council was officially nonpartisan, no more than six council members could be of the same political party. Council members were expected to work part-time. All council members, and either the mayor-commissioner or his assistant, were required to have been residents of the District of Columbia for the three years preceding appointment. All were required to be District residents while serving their terms in office.

Council members had the quasi-legislative powers of the former Board of Commissioners, approving the budget and setting real estate tax rates. The mayor-commissioner could, without any Congressional approval, consolidate District agencies and transfer money between agencies, powers the preceding Board of Commissioners had not possessed. The mayor-commissioner could veto ordinances passed by the Council, but the Council could override the veto with a three-fourths vote.

Despite a push by many Republicans and conservative Democrats in the House of Representatives to reject Johnson's plan, the House of Representatives accepted the new form of government for the District by a vote of 244 to 160. Johnson said that the new District government would be more effective and efficient.

Walter E. Washington was appointed the first mayor-commissioner, with Thomas W. Fletcher as his assistant. The first Council appointments were Chairman John W. Hechinger, Vice Chairman Walter E. Fauntroy, Stanley J. Anderson, Margaret A. Haywood, John A. Nevius, William S. Thompson, J.C. Turner, Polly Shackleton, and Joseph P. Yeldell.

=== 1973 Home Rule Act ===
On December 24, 1973, Congress enacted the District of Columbia Home Rule Act, providing for a popularly elected mayor and 13-member Council. Each of the district's eight wards elects a single member of the council and five members, including the chairman, are elected at large.

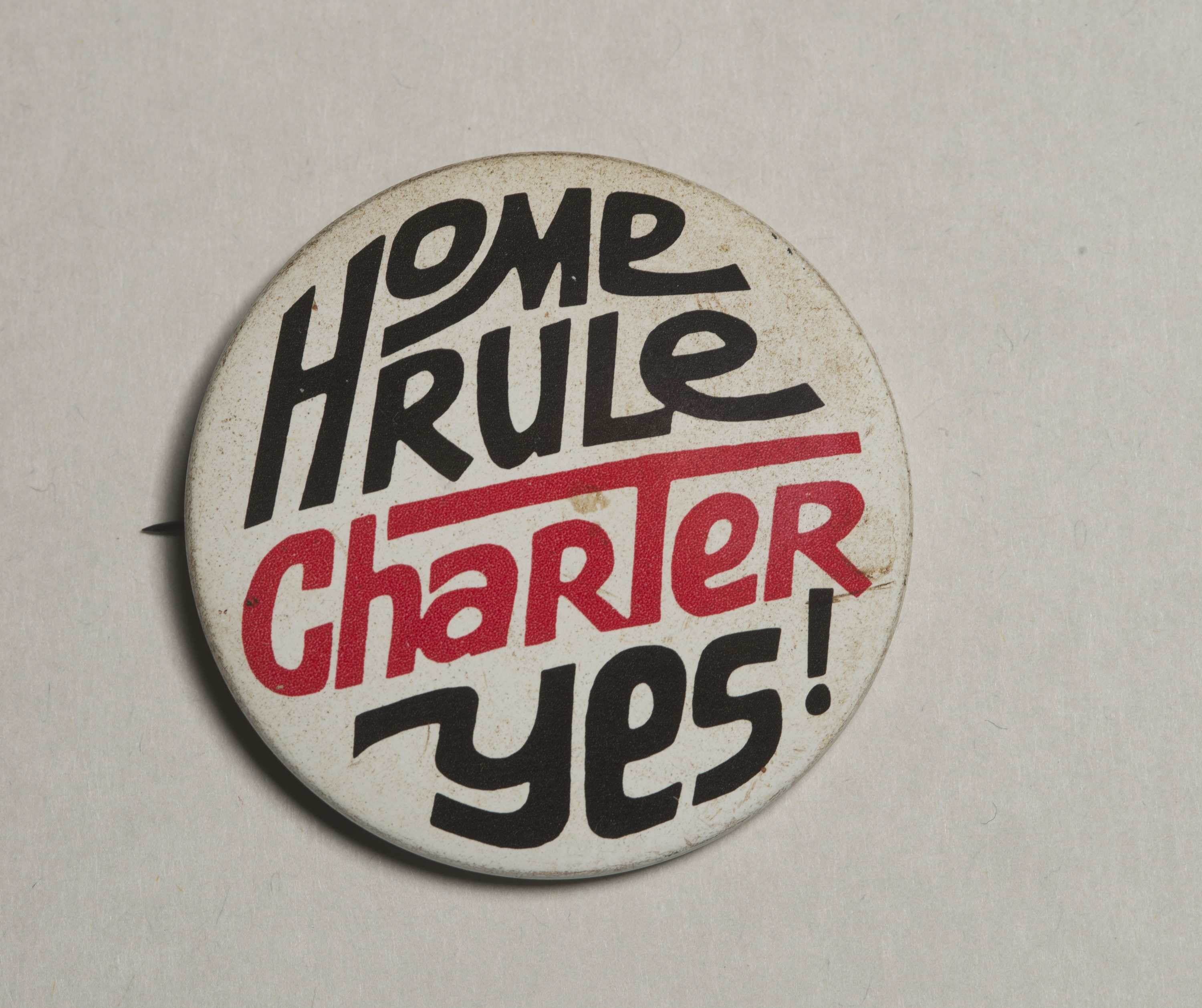
This button was used in a 1974 referendum campaign encouraging residents of the District of Columbia to vote for the Home Rule Charter.

Small neighborhood districts elect 37 Advisory Neighborhood Commissions (ANCs). ANCs traditionally wield a great deal of influence, and the district government routinely considers their suggestions carefully. The Council has the ability to pass local laws and ordinances. However, pursuant to the Home Rule Act all legislation passed by the District of Columbia government, including the district's local budget, remains subject to the approval of Congress.

The Home Rule Act specifically prohibits the Council from enacting certain laws that, among other restrictions, would:

- lend public credit for private projects;
- impose a tax on individuals who work in the District but live elsewhere;
- make any changes to the district's federally mandated height limit;
- pass any law changing the composition or jurisdiction of the local courts;
- enact a local budget that is not balanced; and
- gain any additional authority over the National Capital Planning Commission, Washington Aqueduct, or District of Columbia National Guard.

The Home Rule Act prohibits the District from imposing a commuter tax on non-residents, who comprise over 60% of the district's workforce. In addition, over 50% of property in the District is also exempt from taxation. The Government Accountability Office and other organizations have estimated that these revenue restrictions create a structural deficit in the district's budget of anywhere between $470 million and over $1 billion per year. While Congress typically provides larger grants to the District for federal programs such as Medicaid and the local justice system, analysts claim that the payments do not resolve the imbalance. The proposed FY 2017 budget figures show the District raising about $10 billion in local revenue out of a proposed FY 2017 $13.4 billion budget.

In February 2025, two Republicans in Congress, Representative Andy Ogles, Republican of Tennessee, and Senator Mike Lee, Republican of Utah, introduced a bill to repeal the Home Rule Act of 1973.

== Non-citizen voting ==
D.C. has allowed non-citizen residents, regardless of immigration status, to vote in local elections since February 23, 2023. Non-citizen D.C. residents are only eligible to vote in elections for local offices (Mayor of the District of Columbia, members of the D.C. Council, Attorney General for the District of Columbia, members of the State Board of Education, and members of Advisory Neighborhood Commissions) and on local initiatives, referendums, and amendments to the D.C. Charter. Non-citizens cannot vote in elections for any federal offices.

== Justice system ==
In 1801, Congress created the first court in the District, the Circuit Court of the District of Columbia. It was a court of general jurisdiction and an appellate court, and it handled cases arising under both federal and local law. Eventually, the general jurisdiction and appellate functions were split into two courts, the Supreme Court of the District of Columbia and the District of Columbia Court of Appeals. The justices of these courts had life tenure. For a long time, it was presumed that these were legislative courts, not constitutional courts under Article III, because of the additional local law duties that were outside of Article III jurisdiction. However, during the Great Depression, Congress passed a law reducing the wages of all federal judges who were not protected by the Compensation Clause in Article III. One judge from each of the two courts in the District sued, claiming that they were Article III judges. In O'Donoghue v. United States (1933), the Supreme Court agreed and declared that these courts were both Article III courts and Article I tribunals. After this, in 1970, Congress reorganized the judiciary of the District so that it was represented by four courts: federal and state matters would each be considered be a general jurisdiction court and an appellate court. The preexisting two courts were assigned the federal law duties.

Today, the District's local justice system is centered on the Superior Court of the District of Columbia, which hears all local civil and criminal cases, and the District of Columbia Court of Appeals, which serves as the highest local appeals court in District of Columbia. These local courts are Article I tribunals. Although the local courts are technically the third branch of the D.C. government, they are funded and operated by the United States federal government. Though operated by the federal government, the District's local courts are separate from the United States District Court for the District of Columbia and the United States Court of Appeals for the District of Columbia Circuit, which only hear cases regarding federal law. These courts for federal law were explicitly created under Article III.

The President of the United States appoints the district's local judges from a group of nominees selected by a judicial nomination commission. All presidential nominees are then confirmed by the U.S. Senate. The local Attorney General of the District of Columbia only has jurisdiction in civil proceedings and prosecuting minor offenses such as misdemeanors and traffic violations. The United States Attorney for the District of Columbia is also appointed by the President and is responsible for prosecuting both federal and local felony crimes, such as robbery, murder, aggravated assault, grand theft, and arson. This setup differs from elsewhere in the country where 93% of local prosecutors are directly elected and the remainder are appointed by local elected officials.

The fact that the U.S. Attorneys in the District of Columbia are neither elected nor appointed by district officials leads to criticism that the prosecutors are not responsive to the needs of residents. Efforts to create the position of D.C. district attorney regained attention in 2008. The D.C. district attorney would be elected and have jurisdiction over all local criminal cases, streamlining prosecution and making the justice system more accountable to residents.

== Relationship with Congress ==
Even though the District of Columbia has an elected mayor and district council, significant congressional oversight of the District's local affairs remains in place. Congress has the power to review all bills passed by the council and can prevent them from taking effect even if the council passed them with a large majority. It can also pass legislation for the district without approval from residents or the local government and even revoke the home rule charter altogether. District leaders have long complained about the interventionist approach that Congress members who have no particular attachment to the district take in dealing with the District's local affairs. However, when confronted by hot-button political issues such as the death penalty, gun control, or gay marriage, members of Congress are often pressured to cast votes consistent with the beliefs of their constituents, regardless of the law's effect on the district.

Occasionally, congressional intervention in the district's affairs has produced disastrous results. As an early example from the mid-19th century, when Jacksonian Democrats tried to exercise greater authority over the District, the population convened to request retrocession of the District back to the states of Maryland and Virginia. The efforts to return the northern portion of the District failed; however, the citizens of the District's southern territory of Alexandria successfully petitioned to retrocede that area to Virginia in 1846.

The standing committees charged with oversight of the district, known as the District committees, were also originally believed to be unimportant compared to other committees with greater scope and authority. As such, those appointed to the District committees were often less-respected members of Congress. For example, Theodore G. Bilbo, a senator from Mississippi in the 1930 and '40s, was made chairman of the United States Senate Committee on the District of Columbia during his final years in the Senate. Bilbo, an unapologetic racist, used the appointment to extend segregationist policies among the District's increasingly African American population.

The District committees were largely restructured in the late 1970s and were downgraded to subcommittees in the 1990s. Currently, the District of Columbia is overseen in the House of Representatives by the Committee on Oversight and Government Reform and its Subcommittee on Health Care, District of Columbia, Census and the National Archives. As a courtesy to the district's residents, the District's non-voting delegate, currently Eleanor Holmes Norton, serves as a member of both committees. The District is overseen in the United States Senate by the Committee on Homeland Security and Governmental Affairs and its Subcommittee on Oversight of Government Management, the Federal Workforce and the District of Columbia. The District has no representation in the Senate at all.

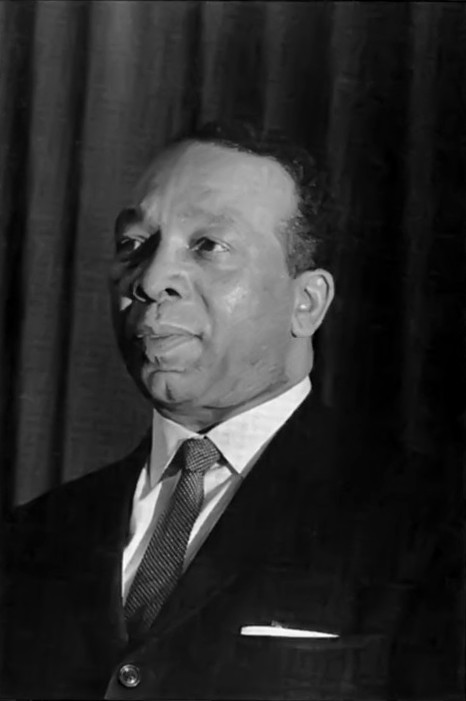
Walter Washington, the first elected mayor of the District of Columbia

Congress has intervened in the District's local affairs several times since the Home Rule Act in 1973. In most instances, Congress has prohibited the District from spending funds to implement laws passed by the district council instead of directly overturning them. Most notable was the prohibition on spending funds to enact the Health Care Benefits Expansion Act of 1992, which extended health benefits to registered domestic partners in the district, and prohibiting the expenditure of funds to lobby for greater representation in Congress. In other instances, however, the Congress has implemented a more active approach in exercising its authority over the District. For example, legislation was passed in 1992 mandating a referendum on the use of the death penalty in the District, and bills to remove the District's strict gun control regulations have been continuously introduced in the Congress as well.

Efforts to roll back the district's gun laws were curtailed following the June 26, 2008, Supreme Court decision in District of Columbia v. Heller. The court held that the district's 1976 handgun ban violates the Second Amendment right to gun ownership. However, the ruling does not prohibit all forms of gun control, and pro-gun rights members of Congress are still attempting to repeal remaining gun regulations such as the District's "assault weapon" ban.

The most significant intrusion into the district's local affairs since the Home Rule Act was when Congress removed the district's authority to control its finances in the mid-1990s. The situation was a result of mismanagement and waste in the district's local government, particularly during the mayoralty of Marion Barry. By 1995, the district had become nearly insolvent, which prompted the Congress to create the District of Columbia Financial Control Board. As part of the restructuring arrangement, the appointed members of the Financial Control Board had the authority to approve all district spending; however, Congress also agreed to provide more funding for federally mandated programs such as Medicaid. Mayor Anthony Williams won election in 1998. His administration oversaw a period of greater prosperity, urban renewal, and budget surpluses. The District regained control over its finances in September 2001, and the oversight board's operations were suspended.

== Proposals for change ==
Advocates of more significant D.C. home rule have proposed several reforms to increase the District's independence from Congress. These proposals generally involve either limiting oversight or allowing the state of Maryland take back the land it ceded to form the District.

=== Legislation ===
While maintaining its authority over the District, several legislative proposals have been made for Congress to restrain the degree of oversight significantly. These initiatives include:

- Allowing greater legislative autonomy and removing the congressional review period required before local legislation becomes law;
- Removing the required congressional review and active approval of the district's local budget; and

As of 2011, all of these proposals were pending before various committees in Congress.

=== Retrocession ===
The process of uniting the District of Columbia with the State of Maryland is referred to as retrocession. The District was originally formed out of parts of both Maryland and Virginia. However, the portion ceded by Virginia was returned to that state in 1846; all the land in present-day D.C. was once part of Maryland. If both the Congress and the Maryland state legislature agreed, jurisdiction over the District of Columbia could be returned to Maryland, possibly excluding a small tract of land immediately surrounding the United States Capitol, the White House, and the Supreme Court building. If the District were returned to Maryland, exclusive jurisdiction over the district by Congress would be terminated. Citizens in D.C. would gain voting representation in Congress as residents of Maryland. Potential obstacles to retrocession include the need for approval by the State of Maryland and the preference of many District residents for independent statehood. Further, retrocession may require a constitutional amendment as the District's role as the seat of government is mandated by the District Clause of the U.S. Constitution. Retrocession could also alter the idea of a separate national capital as envisioned by the U.S. Founding Fathers.

=== Statehood ===
If the District of Columbia were to become a state, Congress would no longer have exclusive authority over the district, and residents would have full voting representation in Congress, including the Senate. However, there are some constitutional considerations with any such statehood proposal. Article Four of the United States Constitution gives the Congress power to grant statehood; the House of Representatives voted on D.C. statehood in November 1993, and the proposal was defeated by a vote of 277 to 153. The House of Representatives again voted on D.C statehood in June 2020 and the proposal passed by a vote of 232 to 180 with the bill moving to the Senate, although it was not passed there. Further, like the issue of retrocession, opponents argue that statehood would violate the District Clause of the U.S. Constitution, and erode the principle of a separate federal district as the seat of government. D.C. statehood could therefore require a constitutional amendment.
