= List of criminal cases in the Marshall Court =

The Marshall Court (1801–1835) heard forty-one criminal cases. The Court heard two writs of error from the United States Circuit Court of the District of Columbia under § 8 of the second Judiciary Act of 1801, six original habeas petitions under § 14 of the Judiciary Act of 1789, thirty-one certificates of division under § 6 of the Judiciary Act of 1802, and two writs of error from the state courts under § 25 of the Judiciary Act of 1789.

The criminal jurisdiction of the Marshall Court was greatly limited by the Court's disclaiming of appellate jurisdiction from the United States circuit courts by means of a writ of error in United States v. More (1805), as well as the Court's disclaiming the authority to issue writs of habeas corpus to prisoners detained pursuant to a post-conviction criminal sentence in Ex parte Kearney (1822) and Ex parte Watkins (1830). Certificates of division could only be issued in criminal cases heard by a two-judge panel consisting of a United States district court judge and a Supreme Court justice riding circuit (the district judge or the circuit rider could also hear cases alone). Further, certificates could not be issued with regard to the legal sufficiency of the evidence—whether on a motion for a new trial, as held in United States v. Daniel (1821), or a motion for a directed verdict, as held in United States v. Bailey (1835).

| Case | Citation | Year | Crime(s) | Author | Dissent(s) | Source of jurisdiction | Lower court | Circuit rider | Notes |
|---|---|---|---|---|---|---|---|---|---|
| United States v. Simms | 5 U.S. (1 Cranch) 252 | 1803 | Faro gambling (Virginia law) | Marshall | None | Writ of error | C.C.D.C. | N/A | |
| United States v. More | 7 U.S. (3 Cranch) 159 | 1805 | Common law exaction of an illegal fee colour of his office (Virginia law) | Marshall | None | Writ of error | C.C.D.C. | N/A | |
| Ex parte Burford | 7 U.S. (3 Cranch) 448 | 1806 | N/A | Marshall | None | Original habeas | C.C.D.C. (habeas); Alexandria County justices of the peace (warrant) | N/A | |
| Ex parte Bollman | 8 U.S. (4 Cranch) 75 | 1807 | Treason and the Neutrality Act of 1794 | Marshall | Johnson | Original habeas | C.C.D.C. | N/A | |
| United States v. Cantril | 8 U.S. (4 Cranch) 167 | 1807 | Counterfeiting | Marshall | None | Certificate of division | C.C.D. Ga. | Johnson | |
| United States v. Hudson | 11 U.S. (7 Cranch) 32 | 1812 | Common law libel | Johnson | None | Certificate of division | C.C.D. Conn. | Livingston | |
| United States v. Tyler | 11 U.S. (7 Cranch) 285 | 1812 | Embargo | Livingston | None | Certificate of division | C.C.D. Vt. | Livingston | |
| United States v. Barber | 13 U.S. (9 Cranch) 243 | 1815 | Embargo | Per curiam | None | Certificate of division | C.C.D. Vt. | Livingston | |
| United States v. Coolidge | 14 U.S. (1 Wheat.) 415 | 1816 | Common law piracy | Johnson | None | Certificate of division | C.C.D. Mass. | Story | |
| United States v. Sheldon | 15 U.S. (2 Wheat.) 119 | 1817 | Embargo | Washington | None | Certificate of division | C.C.D. Vt. | Livingston | |
| United States v. Bevans | 16 U.S. (3 Wheat.) 336 | 1818 | Piracy | Marshall | None | Certificate of division | C.C.D. Mass. | Story | |
| United States v. Palmer | 16 U.S. (3 Wheat.) 610 | 1818 | Piracy | Marshall | Johnson | Certificate of division | C.C.D. Mass. | Story | |
| United States v. Klintock | 18 U.S. (5 Wheat.) 144 | 1820 | Piracy | Marshall | None | Certificate of division | C.C.D. Va. | Marshall | |
| United States v. Smith | 18 U.S. (5 Wheat.) 153 | 1820 | Piracy | Story | Livingston | Certificate of division | C.C.D. Va. | Marshall | |
| United States v. Furlong | 18 U.S. (5 Wheat.) 184 | 1820 | Piracy | Johnson | None | Certificate of division | C.C.D. Ga.; C.C.D.S.C. | Johnson | |
| United States v. Holmes | 18 U.S. (5 Wheat.) 412 | 1820 | Piracy | Washington | None | Certificate of division | C.C.D. Mass. | Story | |
| United States v. Wiltberger | 18 U.S. (5 Wheat.) 76 | 1820 | Piracy | Marshall | None | Certificate of division | C.C.E.D. Pa. | Washington | |
| Cohens v. Virginia | 19 U.S. (6 Wheat.) 264 | 1821 | Lottery (Virginia law) | Marshall | None | Writ of error | Quarterly Session Court for the Borough of Norfolk, Virginia | N/A | |
| United States v. Daniel | 19 U.S. (6 Wheat.) 542 | 1821 | Piracy | Marshall | None | Certificate of division | C.C.D.S.C. | Johnson | |
| Ex parte Kearney | 20 U.S. (7 Wheat.) 38 | 1822 | Contempt of court | Story | None | Original habeas | C.C.D.C. | N/A | |
| United States v. Perez | 22 U.S. (9 Wheat.) 579 | 1824 | Piracy | Story | None | Certificate of division | C.C.S.D.N.Y. | Thompson | |
| United States v. Amedy | 24 U.S. (11 Wheat.) 392 | 1826 | Maritime insurance fraud | Story | None | Certificate of division | C.C.D. Va. | Marshall | |
| United States v. Kelly | 24 U.S. (11 Wheat.) 417 | 1826 | Piracy | Washington | None | Certificate of division | C.C.E.D. Pa. | Washington | |
| United States v. Ortega | 24 U.S. (11 Wheat.) 467 | 1826 | Assault on ambassador | Washington | None | Certificate of division | C.C.E.D. Pa. | Washington | |
| United States v. Gooding | 25 U.S. (12 Wheat.) 460 | 1827 | Slave trading | Story | None | Certificate of division | C.C.D. Md. | Duvall | |
| United States v. Marchant | 25 U.S. (12 Wheat.) 480 | 1827 | Piracy | Story | None | Certificate of division | C.C.D. Mass. | Story | |
| Ex parte Watkins | 28 U.S. (3 Pet.) 193 | 1830 | Common law fraud (Maryland law) | Marshall | None | Original habeas | C.C.D.C. | N/A | |
| United States v. Paul | 31 U.S. (6 Pet.) 141 | 1832 | Assimilative burglary (New York law) | Marshall | None | Certificate of division | C.C.S.D.N.Y. | Thompson | |
| United States v. Reyburn | 31 U.S. (6 Pet.) 352 | 1832 | Neutrality Act of 1818 | Thompson | None | Certificate of division | C.C.D. Md. | Duvall | |
| United States v. Quincy | 31 U.S. (6 Pet.) 445 | 1832 | Neutrality Act of 1818 | Thompson | None | Certificate of division | C.C.D. Md. | Duvall | |
| Worcester v. Georgia | 31 U.S. (6 Pet.) 515 | 1832 | Unlicensed presence in Cherokee country (Georgia law) | Marshall | Baldwin | Writ of error | Superior Court for the County of Gwinnett, Georgia | N/A | |
| United States v. Phillips | 31 U.S. (6 Pet.) 776 | 1832 | Interference with diplomatic immunity | Per curiam | None | Certificate of division | C.C.E.D. Pa. | Baldwin | |
| United States v. Turner | 32 U.S. (7 Pet.) 132 | 1833 | Counterfeiting | Story | None | Certificate of division | C.C.D.N.C. | Marshall | |
| United States v. Wilson | 32 U.S. (7 Pet.) 150 | 1833 | Mail robbery | Marshall | None | Certificate of division | C.C.E.D. Pa. | Baldwin | |
| United States v. Brewster | 32 U.S. (7 Pet.) 164 | 1833 | Counterfeiting | Per curiam | None | Certificate of division | C.C.E.D. Pa. | Baldwin | |
| United States v. Mills | 32 U.S. (7 Pet.) 138 | 1833 | Mail robbery | Thompson | None | Certificate of division | C.C.D.N.C. | Marshall | |
| Ex parte Watkins | 32 U.S. (7 Pet.) 568 | 1833 | Common law fraud (Maryland law) | Story | Johnson; McLean | Original habeas | C.C.D.C. | N/A | |
| United States v. Randenbush | 33 U.S. (8 Pet.) 288 | 1834 | Counterfeiting | Marshall | None | Certificate of division | C.C.D. Pa. | Baldwin | |
| United States v. Bailey | 34 U.S. (9 Pet.) 238 | 1835 | False statements | Story | McLean | Certificate of division | C.C.D. Ky. | McLean | |
| United States v. Bailey | 34 U.S. (9 Pet.) 267 | 1835 | False statements | Marshall | None | Certificate of division | C.C.D. Ky. | McLean | |
| Ex parte Milburn | 34 U.S. (9 Pet.) 704 | 1835 | Faro gambling (Maryland law) | Story | None | Original habeas | C.C.D.C. | N/A | |
