= District of Columbia Organic Act =

District of Columbia Organic Act may refer to:

- District of Columbia Organic Act of 1801, an act by the United States Congress which incorporated the District of Columbia and placed it under the exclusive control of Congress
- District of Columbia Organic Act of 1871, an act by the United States Congress which created a single municipal government for the entire District of Columbia
