= Rubus scambens =

Scientific classification
- Kingdom: Plantae
- Clade: Tracheophytes
- Clade: Angiosperms
- Clade: Eudicots
- Clade: Rosids
- Order: Rosales
- Family: Rosaceae
- Genus: Rubus
- Species: R. scambens

Binomial name
- Rubus scambens L.H.Bailey

Species of fruit and plant

Rubus scambens is uncommon North American species of brambles in the rose family. It grows in the east-central United States, in the states of Maryland and Virginia, as well as in the District of Columbia (also called the City of Washington, the nation's capital).

The genetics of Rubus is extremely complex, so that it is difficult to decide on which groups should be recognized as species. There are many rare species with limited ranges such as this. Further study is suggested to clarify the taxonomy.
