= District of Columbia retrocession =

Return of some land of the District of Columbia to Virginia

Territorial evolution of the District of Columbia

District of Columbia retrocession refers to the act of returning to Virginia the land from the District of Columbia that Virginia had previously ceded to the federal government of the United States and proposals to do the same with the some or all of the land Maryland ceded. The land was originally ceded to the federal government by Virginia and Maryland in 1790 for the purpose of creating a federal district for the new national capital; the capital was moved from Philadelphia to what was then called the City of Washington in 1800. After moving through various stages of federal and state approval, the Virginia portion was retroceded in March 1847.

The District of Columbia's creation was the result of the district clause of the United States Constitution. In the 1790 Residence Act, the district originally consisted of 100 square miles (259 km^{2}; 25,900 ha) of land, which was ceded to it by Maryland and Virginia, and it straddled the Potomac River. The 1801 Organic Act placed the areas under the control of the United States Congress and removed the right of residents to vote in federal elections. The portion west of the Potomac River, ceded by Virginia, included two parts comprising 31 square miles (80 km^{2}; 8,029 ha): the city of Alexandria, at the extreme southern shore, and the rural and short-lived Alexandria County, D.C.

After decades of debate about the disenfranchisement that came with district citizenship, and tensions related to perceived negligence by the U.S. Congress, and efforts to maintain the slave laws of Virginia,

this portion of the district was returned to Virginia in 1847. The remaining district assumed its current boundaries and area of 68.34 square miles (177.0 km^{2}; 17,700 ha) east of the Potomac.

Subsequent proposals to return all or part of the remaining portion of the District of Columbia to Maryland have been cited as one way to provide full voting representation in Congress and return local control of the district to its residents. D.C. statehood advocates have noted that ceding Washington, D.C., to Maryland may not have the support of the government in Maryland.

== History ==
=== 19th century ===
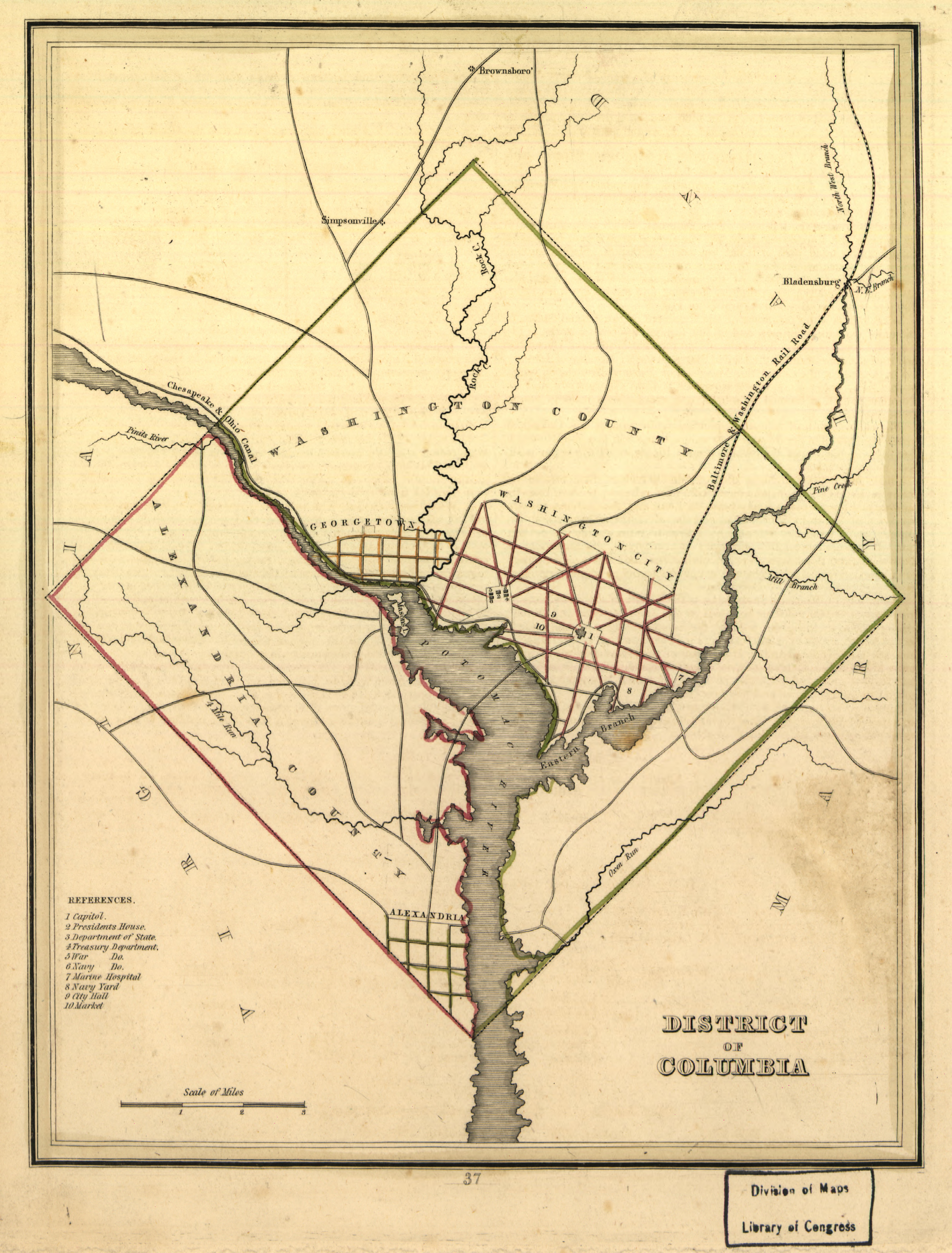
Map of the District of Columbia in 1835, prior to the retrocession of Alexandria County

The Organic Act of 1801 organized the District of Columbia and placed the federal territory under the exclusive control of Congress. The district was organized into two counties: Washington County on the east side of the Potomac River; and Alexandria County on the west side. The incorporation of the City of Alexandria was retained in Alexandria County, and the incorporation of the town of Georgetown was retained in Washington County, while the City of Washington was newly incorporated in Washington County.

Following the 1801 Act, citizens located in the district were no longer considered residents of Maryland or Virginia, thus ending their representation in Congress, their ability to weigh in on Constitutional amendments, and their unlimited home rule. Ever since, residents of the district and the surrounding states have sought ways to remedy these issues, with the most common being retrocession, statehood, and constitutional amendment.

While representation is often cited as a grievance of district residents, limited self-rule has often played a large or larger part in retrocession movements. In 1801, members of the levy courts that governed Washington County and Alexandria County were all chosen by the president, as was the mayor of the City of Washington from 1802 to 1820. Other officers, such as marshals and attorneys, were also appointed by the president. When the district was unified into one government in 1871, the people again lost the right to elect their leaders and, from 1871 until 1975, the government was led by a governor, commissioners, or a mayor-commissioner appointed by the president.

Almost immediately after the Organic Act of 1801, Congress took up proposals for the return of the territory to the states. An 1803 bill introduced by John Bacon of Massachusetts was defeated 66–26; an 1804 bill from John Dawson of Virginia was rejected by a large majority without debate; an 1806 bill introduced by John Smilie of Pennsylvania was never brought up for a vote; and the same fate occurred to an 1820 bill introduced by William Darlington of Pennsylvania. Members of Congress proposed retrocession because they found disenfranchisement of the district's residents to be unacceptable. Members of Congress debated whether the district could be immediately returned without the consent of the residents and the legislatures of Maryland and Virginia. Some representatives rejected the idea of retrocession entirely and concluded that the Congress lacked the constitutional authority to return the territory. When debate began to be intertwined with calls to move the capital elsewhere, after the burning of the White House and Congress during the War of 1812, calls for retrocession began to subside.

In 1822, the citizens of the district again began to desire a different political situation. A committee appointed by Washington City called on Congress to either make the area a territory or to retrocede it to the original states. That same year bills were introduced that would return Georgetown to Maryland and Alexandria to Virginia.

== Virginia retrocession ==
There were Federal bills to reunite the southern portion of the district with Virginia as early as 1803, but it was only in the late 1830s that these garnered local support. People from Alexandria actively protested the 1803 effort. Early efforts, supported by the Democratic-Republicans, focused on the lack of home rule and were often combined with retrocession of some or all of the area north of the Potomac as well.

The first local effort for retrocession started in 1818, when the grand jury for the County of Alexandria voted for retrocession and to appoint a committee to that end. Similar efforts in Georgetown and dissatisfaction elsewhere led to some modest changes, most notably that residents of the City of Washington were allowed to elect their own mayor, but in Alexandria that did little to quell discontent and after an 1822 debate in the local papers, the Grand Jury again voted for retrocession and a committee to promote it.

In 1824, Thomson Francis Mason, future mayor of Alexandria and grandson of George Mason, called an informal town meeting at which retrocession was discussed and a resolution passed to create a petition. But a competing group, led by merchant Phineas Janney, held a meeting shortly thereafter and agreed to draw up a petition against retrocession. A petition with 500 names supporting retrocession was submitted to Congress, as was a letter protesting it, but Congress declined to act on it and the matter died.

In 1832, Philip Doddridge, chairman of the Committee on the District of Columbia, attempting to codify district law and address grievances of residents, asked the Alexandria Town Council if they would like retrocession to Virginia, a delegate to Congress, or a local district legislature. The vote was held on January 24, 1832, with 437 voting for no change, 402 voting for retrocession, and 1 each for a delegate or legislature. Notably, those from outside Alexandria City voted overwhelmingly for retrocession and the town council of Alexandria opposed all three proposals, but if one were forced on them, they claimed to prefer retrocession.

In 1835, the Common Council of Alexandria appointed a committee to deal with the town's interests before Congress. They presented an eleven-page memorandum to the District Committee urging retrocession, but it was not taken up.

When the proposition of abolishing slavery in the district was brought to the Senate in 1836, U.S. senator William C. Preston of South Carolina introduced a bill to retrocede the entire district to Maryland and Virginia, to "relieve Congress of the burden of repeated petitions on the subject". But both the abolition effort and retrocession failed to receive a vote that year. In 1837, when Washington City began to agitate for a territorial government for the district, which would necessitate one set of laws for both counties, the subject of retrocession was again debated in Alexandria and Georgetown.

In 1840, retrocession received renewed attention, and concrete steps were taken that would eventually end with retrocession six years later. That year, the banks of the District of Columbia went to Congress to seek rechartering, but the simple measure got wrapped up in national politics and a debate about banks in general. When the recharter bill failed and the banks were forced to cease operations in July, Alexandria called a town meeting at which they unanimously chose to begin pursuing retrocession. At the same time, Senator Robert J. Walker (D-MS) introduced a bill seeking to ascertain the desire of residents outside the limits of the City of Washington with regard to retrocession, but the bill failed. In August 1840, the people of Alexandria presented a memorial for retrocession to Congress with around 700 signatures in favor and only 12 opposed. On September 28, 1840, the Alexandria Common Council approved a vote on the issue, and on October 12, the vote was overwhelmingly for retrocession (666–211). In contrast to the 1832 vote, the vote in the county outside of the town (now Arlington), however, was overwhelmingly against (53–5).

In 1844, four years later, John Campbell of South Carolina introduced a resolution to retrocede the entire district to Maryland and Virginia, to prevent abolitionists from ending slavery in the district, but it was never taken up and he died a year later.

In early 1846, three years after the Alexandria Canal opened, Alexandria Common Council member Lewis McKenzie, motivated by the large corporation taxes that had to be paid to fund the canal, restarted the retrocession movement when he introduced a motion that the mayor resend the results of the 1840 pro-retrocession vote to Congress and the Virginia legislature. It was approved unanimously on January 8, 1846. Two weeks later, Virginia replied asking that two representatives be sent to Richmond to discuss the matter, and the council chose lawyer Francis L. Smith and Common Council member Robert Brockett. On February 2, 1846, the Virginia General Assembly suspended their rules to pass unanimously an act accepting the retrocession of Alexandria County if Congress approved.

The debate over retrocession then moved to the U.S. Congress, where the Town Committee met with the District Committee of the House to ask for both retrocession and relief from their Canal debt, with the Committee expressing support of relief if retrocession were carried out. Town leaders then expected a bill that would provide for both, causing many to believe that the issues were tied together and that to vote for retrocession would be to vote for Congress to take on Alexandria's debt. Later the House decided to decouple the issues and to get it passed had to abandon relief altogether. On February 16, 1846, the House adopted a resolution to study the retrocession of the district to Maryland and Virginia, and on February 22 adopted a bill for the south portion. In May, the bill was debated in the House of Representatives. There was some concern about the constitutionality of retrocession, and about claims the law was being supported by eastern Virginia leaders to gain them further advantage over the west. Amendments allowing free black residents to vote on retrocession and making the vote district-wide failed, but an amendment preventing Congress from paying any of Alexandria's debt was approved. The bill as proposed would have retained for the district all the land on the south side that was needed for the Long Bridge abutment, but this clause was removed during debate as it was deemed improper. The bill passed by a vote of 95–66.

Prior to the United States Senate vote on the bill, those against retrocession gathered more than 150 opponents to it, relying on those who had expected retrocession to come with relief from payments for the canal and those who would not be allowed to vote under the House bill. The Washington City Board of Aldermen and Common council also expressed opposition to retrocession of Alexandria. The Senate passed the retrocession bill on July 2 by a vote of 32–14, with a mix of Southerners and Northerners on each side. It was signed into law by James K. Polk on July 9, 1846. Polk chose commissioners as called for in the law on August 18, most notable among them was George Washington Parke Custis. Custis had originally opposed retrocession, but once Virginia agreed to provide relief, Custis supported it.

The referendum on retrocession was held on September 1–2, 1846. Prior to the referendum a series of public debates were held in August at locations such as the court house and Ball's Crossroads, and the night before the vote supporters of retrocession held a rally. The first vote in favor of retrocession was cast by the mayor, William Veitch, and it was never close. The residents of the Alexandria County voted in favor of retrocession, 763 to 222; however, the residents of the county outside of Alexandria City voted against retrocession 106 to 29. President Polk certified the referendum and issued a proclamation of transfer on September 7, 1846. When the results were announced on the evening of the 2nd, a large crowd gathered and marched through town singing songs and celebrating.

With the presidential proclamation, Virginia gained title to Alexandria County, but had not extended its jurisdiction to it. Locals, however, began changing their names to note their location in Virginia, and on September 9 The Alexandria Gazette, a newspaper in Alexandria, changed its masthead to include the Virginia seal and declare itself printed in "Alexandria, Virginia". The Virginia General Assembly, however, did not immediately accept the retrocession offer. Virginia legislators were concerned that the people of Alexandria County had not been properly included in the retrocession proceedings. After months of debate, the Virginia legislature voted to formally accept the retrocession legislation on March 13, 1847. A celebration and local holiday in honor of retrocession was then held on March 20, when the act took effect.

The movement for retrocession was largely driven by a failure of Congress to manage the area as residents wanted them to and by a belief among merchants that retrocession would be good for business. A number of factors aided the movement to return the area to Virginia:

- Alexandria had gone into economic decline because of neglect by Congress. Alexandria needed infrastructure improvements in order to compete with other ports in the area such as Georgetown, which was further inland and on the Chesapeake and Ohio Canal. Members of Congress from other areas of Virginia used their power to prohibit funding for projects, such as the Alexandria Canal, which would have increased competition with their home districts. Returning Alexandria to Virginia allowed residents to seek financing for projects without interference from Congress.
- A 1791 amendment to the Residence Act specifically prohibited the "erection of the public buildings otherwise than on the Maryland side of the river Potomac." The institutions of the federal government, including the White House and the United States Capitol, were therefore located in Washington, on the east side of the Potomac River. This made Alexandria less important to the functioning of the national government.
- At the time, Alexandria was a major market in the slave trade. Rumors circulated that abolitionists in Congress were attempting to end slavery in the nation's capital, which could have affected the area's slave-based economy.
- If Alexandria were returned to the Commonwealth of Virginia, the move would add two additional representatives to the Virginia General Assembly.

As blacks could not vote with their ballots, those who could did so with their feet: the number of free blacks in Alexandria plunged by a third, from 1,962 in 1840 to 1,409 in 1850.

One argument against retrocession was that the federal government did, in fact, use Alexandria variously as a military outpost, a signal corps site, and a cemetery. (The Pentagon as the national military headquarters would not be built until 1941.)

Confirming the fears of pro-slavery Alexandrians, the Compromise of 1850 outlawed the slave trade in the district, although not slavery itself.

=== Recession ===
There were several attempts to have retrocession repealed or otherwise undone, but none of them succeeded. At the beginning of Civil War in 1861, President Abraham Lincoln in his first State of the Union address called for the original borders to be restored over security concerns, but this idea was rejected by the United States Senate. In 1866, Senator Benjamin Wade introduced legislation to repeal retrocession on the grounds that the Civil War proved the necessity of it for defense of the Capital. In 1873 and again in 1890 some residents of Alexandria petitioned congress to repeal retrocession, either because of the state tax burden or a belief that it was unconstitutional.

In 1902, U.S. Representative James McMillan, chair of the District Committee introduced a resolution to force the Attorney General to bring a lawsuit that would determine the constitutionality of retrocession as he saw restoring Washington, D.C., to its original size as critical to the U.S. But when McMillan died later that year, the resolution died with him.

The campaign that drew the most attention began in 1909, powered by support of President William Howard Taft. Business leaders in Alexandria passed around a petition asking for the county to be restored to the district. President Taft and members of Congress supported it, citing the need for the district to expand to accommodate the growing government. In May 1909, Everis A. Hayes of California introduced a bill in Congress that would return Alexandria County - less the towns of Alexandria and Falls Church - to the District of Columbia, but it was reported adversely by committee despite President Taft's stated desire that the district be expanded. In 1910, Senator Thomas Carter launched an effort to roll back what he called the "Crime of '46".

In 1913, Taft expressed a desire to challenge the 1846 retrocession in court, but as he was by then a lame duck, it died with the end of his presidency. After he left office, Taft called the Virginia retrocession an "egregious blunder" in a 1915 National Geographic article, and noted that he had approached the Virginia Congressional delegation about restoring "all or a part of that which had been retroceded", but learned that because Alexandria had become so prosperous, the Virginia legislature would never willingly part with it.

=== Repercussions ===
In 1850, after retrocession was completed, Virginia asked the federal government to return to it $120,000 (equivalent to $4,640,000 in 2025) that it had given it to aid in the erection of public buildings. With some objection, Congress complied.

In 1942, retrocession and the subsequent boundary between DC and Virginia became an issue in deciding who had jurisdiction over National Airport.

=== Constitutionality ===
The constitutionality of the retrocession has been called into question. The contract clause found in Article One of the United States Constitution prohibits states from breaching contracts to which they are themselves a party. By annexing Alexandria in 1846, Virginia arguably breached its contractual obligation to "forever cede and relinquish" the territory for use as the permanent seat of the United States government. President William Howard Taft also believed the retrocession to be unconstitutional and tried to have the land given back to the district.

The Supreme Court of the United States never issued a firm opinion on whether the retrocession of the Virginia portion of the District of Columbia was constitutional. In the case of Phillips v. Payne (1875), the U.S. Supreme Court held that Virginia had de facto jurisdiction over the area returned by Congress in 1846, and dismissed the tax case brought by the plaintiff on the grounds that a citizen lacked standing. The court, however, did not rule on the core constitutional matter of the retrocession. Writing the majority opinion, Justice Noah Haynes Swayne stated only that:

The plaintiff in error is estopped from raising the point which he seeks to have decided. He cannot, under the circumstances, vicariously raise a question, nor force upon the parties to the compact an issue which neither of them desires to make.

— Noah Haynes Swayne

The United States Circuit Court of the District of Columbia had previously ruled that retrocession was constitutional in the 1849 case Sheehy vs. the Bank of the Potomac.

== Proposed Maryland retrocession ==
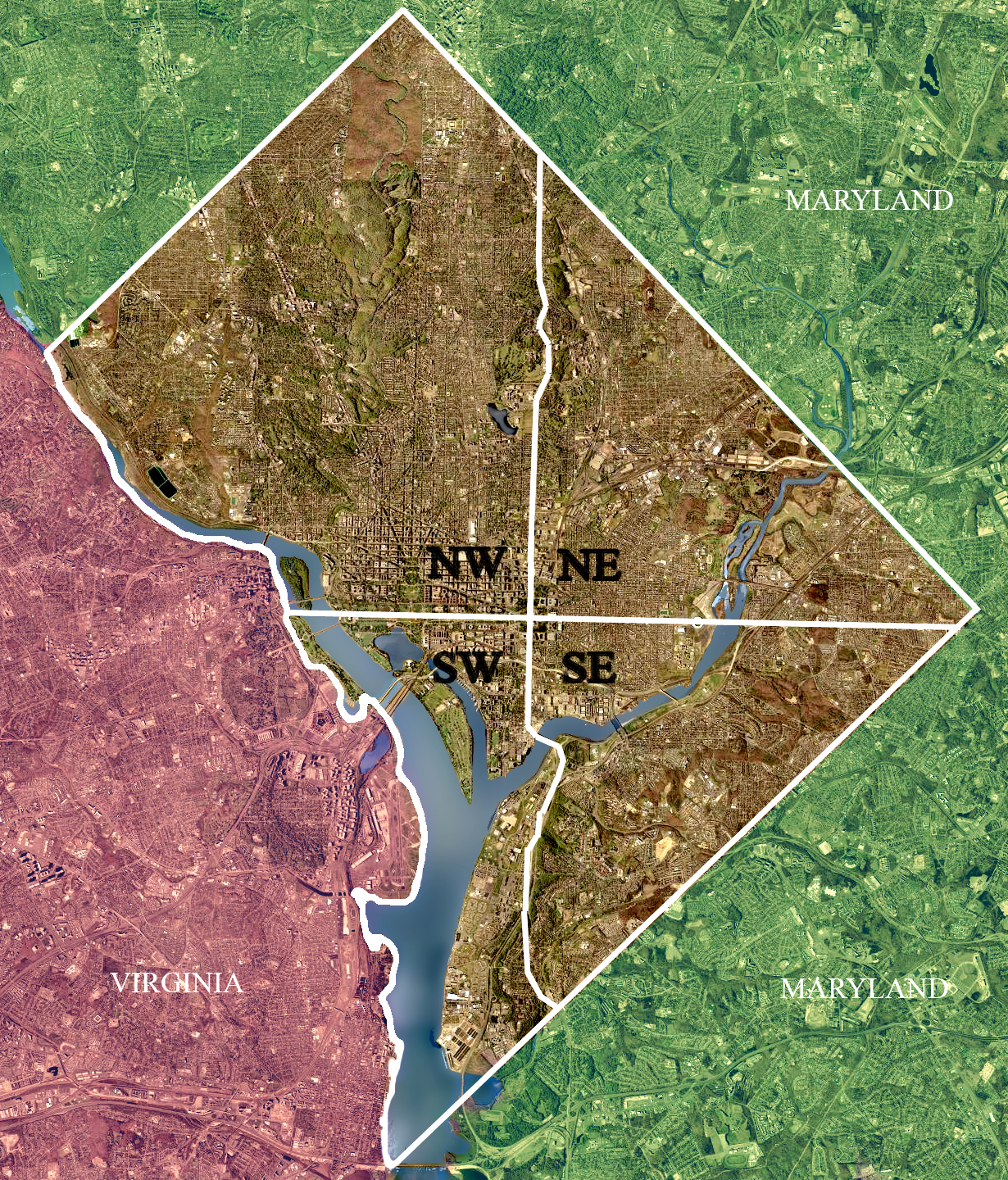
Satellite view of the current boundaries of Washington, D.C., in relation to the states of Maryland (green) and Virginia (pink)

Federal bills that would reunite the northern portion of the district, in part or in whole, with Maryland date back to 1803, but in contrast to the southern portion, local residents almost always voted against it when given the choice. In 1826, in an informal referendum on the retrocession of Georgetown, retrocession won by one vote, but due to low voter turnout it was decided that it was not supported by the general populace. In 1836, U.S. senator William C. Preston of South Carolina introduced a bill to retrocede the entire district to Maryland and Virginia, to "relieve Congress of the burden of repeated petitions on the subject" of slavery in the district. In 1839 some members of Congress proposed retrocession of the portion of the district west of Rock Creek to Maryland.

Proposals going back to the 1840s would handle retrocession north of the Potomac similarly to how it was done south of it, with jurisdiction over this area returned to Maryland following approval of Congress, the Maryland legislature and local voters; the difference being that it would carve out a small rump district of land immediately surrounding the United States Capitol, the White House and the Supreme Court building which, in a 2008 bill, would become known as the "National Capital Service Area". The idea to retrocede all but the federal lands to Maryland dates back to at least 1848.

In the 21st century, some members of Congress such as U.S. representative Dan Lungren, have proposed returning most parts of the city to Maryland in order to grant the residents of the District of Columbia voting representation and control over their local affairs. These attempts, mostly supported by Republicans, have failed: H.R. 810 & H.R. 381, both sponsored by U.S. representative Ralph Regula (R-OH); and H.R. 1858, H.R. 1015, H.R. 3732 and H.R. 2681, all sponsored by U.S. representative Louie Gohmert (R-TX).

=== Problems ===
One problem with retrocession is that the state of Maryland may not want to take the district back. In the opinion of former Rep. Tom Davis of Virginia, discussing the matter in 1998, retroceding the district to Maryland without that state's consent may require a constitutional amendment.

=== Alternative proposal ===
An alternative proposal to retrocession was the District of Columbia Voting Rights Restoration Act of 2004 (H.R. 3709), which would have treated the residents of the district as residents of Maryland for the purposes of congressional representation. Maryland's congressional delegation would then have been apportioned accordingly to include the population of the district. Those in favor of such a plan argued that the Congress already has the necessary authority to pass such legislation without the constitutional concerns of other proposed remedies. From the foundation of the district in 1790 until the passage of the Organic Act of 1801, citizens living in D.C. continued to vote for members of Congress in Maryland or Virginia; legal scholars therefore propose that the Congress has the power to restore those voting rights while maintaining the integrity of the federal district. The proposed legislation, however, never made it out of committee.

=== Political support ===
Opposition by district residents was confirmed in a 2000 George Washington University study when only 21% of those polled supported the option of retrocession. A 2016 poll by Public Policy Polling of 879 Maryland residents showed that only 28% supported annexing the District of Columbia while 44% were opposed.

== Ongoing changes and debate over self-governance ==
In 1975, the district government was reorganized with citizens allowed to elect their own mayor and city council members, but all laws were subject to congressional review, which has been used in limited, but notable ways. Congress also still exercises its unique power over the district in other ways, such as limiting the height of D.C.'s buildings, preventing the district from calling its mayor a governor, preventing it from imposing a commuter tax, and determining who sits on its local courts, whose judges are all appointed by the president. The district is further limited by federally formed bodies like the National Capital Planning Commission and the Commission of Fine Arts (CFA), which exercise considerable power in the district with only minority local representation, in the case of NCPC, or with no local representation, such as for the CFA.

From the 1993 statehood failure through the failure of the 2009 House Voting Rights Act, neither statehood nor retrocession was a legislative priority by either party as supporters of D.C. voting rights pursued a partial legislative solution giving D.C. one House member. But in 2014, efforts again began to grant D.C. statehood. That effort led to the 2016 Washington, D.C., statehood referendum and culminated in Bill H.R. 1, which included a nonbinding expression of support for statehood, passed 234 to 193 in March 2019. Then on June 26, 2020, the House voted 232–180 to admit the state of Washington, Douglass Commonwealth, composed of most of the territory of the District of Columbia. It was the first time a statehood bill for the district passed either chamber.

== See also ==
- District of Columbia (until 1871)
- District of Columbia federal voting rights
- District of Columbia home rule
- District of Columbia statehood movement
- History of the District of Columbia
- Outline of Washington, D.C.
- Timeline of Washington, D.C.

== Bibliography ==
- Goldberg, Alfred (1992). The Pentagon: The First Fifty Years. Office of the Secretary of Defense / Government Printing Office. ISBN 0-16-037979-2.
- Vogel, Steve (2007). The Pentagon – A History: The Untold Story of the Wartime Race to Build the Pentagon and to Restore it Sixty Years Later. Random House. ISBN 978-0-8129-7325-9.
