= District of Ohio =

United States federal judicial district

The District of Ohio was a federal judicial district of the United States created by the Judiciary Act of 1801 which consisted of the Northwest and Indiana territories. It marks an early use of the term Ohio for an area of land as opposed to the long-named Ohio River before the establishment of a state of that name, but otherwise was of little long-term consequence, as the Judiciary Act of 1801 was repealed the next year.
