= Stuart v. Laird =

- Supreme Court of the United States

Argued February 23–24, 1803 Decided March 2, 1803
- Full case name: Hugh Stuart v. John Laird
- Citations: 5 U.S. 299 (more) 1 Cranch 299; 2 L. Ed. 115; 1803 U.S. LEXIS 362

Case history
- Prior: Error from the 5th circuit in the Virginia district

Court membership
- Chief Justice John Marshall Associate Justices William Cushing · William Paterson; Samuel Chase · Bushrod Washington; Alfred Moore

Case opinion
- Majority: Paterson, joined by Cushing, Chase, Washington, Moore
- Marshall took no part in the consideration or decision of the case.

Stuart v. Laird, 5 U.S. (1 Cranch) 299 (1803), was a case decided by United States Supreme Court notably a week after its famous decision in Marbury v. Madison.

Stuart dealt with a judgment of a circuit judge whose position had been abolished by the repeal of the Judiciary Act of 1801. Stuart's lawyer was Charles Lee, who also represented William Marbury. John Laird asked the Supreme Court to uphold the judge's ruling. Stuart's team argued that only the court rendering a judgment could enforce it and that the Judiciary Act of 1802 had been unconstitutional, to which Stuart lost on both accounts. The Court reviewed and upheld the Judiciary Act of 1802 and averted a dangerous showdown between the legislative and the judicial branches of the United States government.

== Background ==
The case involved the Judiciary Act of 1801, which created a number of federal judgeships, who were called "midnight judges" since the Act had been passed by the lame-duck members of the Federalist Party during its final days in office. The Act established new circuit court judges to hear intermediate appeals.

As a result, Supreme Court justices would no longer have to "ride circuit," which entailed substantial and often-dangerous travel, to sit with district (trial) court judges to hear appeals throughout the nation. Soon after its passage, the Act was replaced by the Repeal Act of March 8, 1802. In passing the Judiciary Act of 1802, Congress "also postponed the next term of the Supreme Court until 1803," which prevented the Court from ruling on the Act's constitutionality until after going into effect, according to law professor William Nelson. Federalists attacked the Democratic-Republican Party's new legislation by arguing that federal judges were appointed for life and so could not be constitutionally removed by the Repeal Act. The Judiciary Act of 1802 reinstated circuit courts but also resurrected the practice of circuit riding. Many thought the 1802 Act to be unconstitutional. One of them was newly appointed Chief Justice John Marshall, who argued that justices should not have to preside over circuit courts unless they were commissioned as circuit court judges. He wrote of the other justices, "I am not of opinion that we can under our present appointments hold circuit courts, but I presume a contrary opinion is held by the Court and, if so, I shall conform to it."

Justice Samuel Chase agreed with Marshall, but the other justices disagreed.

== Decision ==
With Marshall not participating but very active behind the scenes, Justice William Paterson held for a unanimous Court that Congress had the authority under the Constitution both to establish and to abolish lower federal courts.

== Aftermath ==
Although the Court sustained the Judiciary Act of 1802, the issue of circuit riding was substantially lessened because the Act effectively made circuit riding optional by requiring only one federal judge for a quorum on any circuit court. As a result, Supreme Court justices could rely on district court judges to hear intermediate appeals. That flexibility proved crucial to the demise of circuit riding. By the 1840s, the justices had all but stopped holding circuit courts.

Scholars such as Bruce Ackerman have pointed to the decision as part of the opposition Federalist Court's accommodation of the new political regime.

== See also ==
- List of United States Supreme Court cases, volume 5
- Marbury v. Madison (1803)
- United States courts of appeals
- United States v. More (1805)
