= District of Columbia (until 1871) =

Animated map of the District of Columbia. The city of Washington was not incorporated until 1802.

The District of Columbia was created in 1801 as the federal district of the United States, with territory previously held by the states of Maryland and Virginia ceded to the federal government of the United States for the purpose of creating its federal district, which would encompass the new national capital of the United States, the City of Washington. The district came into existence, with its own judges and marshals, through the District of Columbia Organic Act of 1801; previously it was the Territory of Columbia. According to specific language in the U.S. Constitution, it was 100 square miles (259 km^{2}).

The district encompassed three small cities: Alexandria, formerly in Virginia, Georgetown, formerly Maryland, and the deliberately planned central core, the City of Washington. Both the White House and the United States Capitol were already completed and in use by 1800 as called for by the 1791 L'Enfant Plan for the City of Washington, although the city was not formally chartered until 1802. Beyond those cities, the remainder of the district was farmland organized by the 1801 Act into two counties, Washington County, D.C., on the Maryland side, and Alexandria County, D.C., on the Virginia side, encompassing today's Arlington County, Virginia, and the independent city of Alexandria.

The district was governed directly by the U.S. Congress from the beginning. Alexandria City and County were ceded back from the federal government to the commonwealth of Virginia in 1846, in a process known as retrocession, anticipating the 1850 ban on slave trading (but not slavery) in the district.

Washington and Georgetown retained their separate charters for seventy years, until the District of Columbia Organic Act of 1871. That act cancelled the charters of the towns and brought the entire area within the district borders under one municipal government, ending any distinction between "the District of Columbia" and "Washington", making the two terms effectively synonymous.

== Choice of location ==
Congress determined, in the Residence Act of 1790, that the nation's capital be on the Potomac, between the Anacostia River and today's Williamsport, Maryland, and in a federal district up to 10 miles square. The exact location was to be determined by President George Washington, familiar with the area from his nearby home and properties at Mt. Vernon, Virginia.

Its trans-state location reflected a compromise between the Southern and Northern states. Virginia lobbied for the selection, an idea opposed by New York and Pennsylvania, both of which had previously housed the nation's capital. Maryland, whose State House was older than that of Virginia, and like Virginia a slave state, was chosen as a compromise. At Washington's request the City of Alexandria was included in the district, though with the provision that no federal buildings could be built there. The new capital district was at about the center of the country.

About 2/3 of the original district was in Maryland and 1/3 in Virginia, and the wide Potomac in the middle. The future district was surveyed in 1791–92; 24 of its surviving stone markers are in Maryland, 12 in Virginia. Washington decided that the capital's location would be located between the mouth of the Anacostia River and Georgetown, which sits at the Potomac's head of navigation.

== Political representation ==
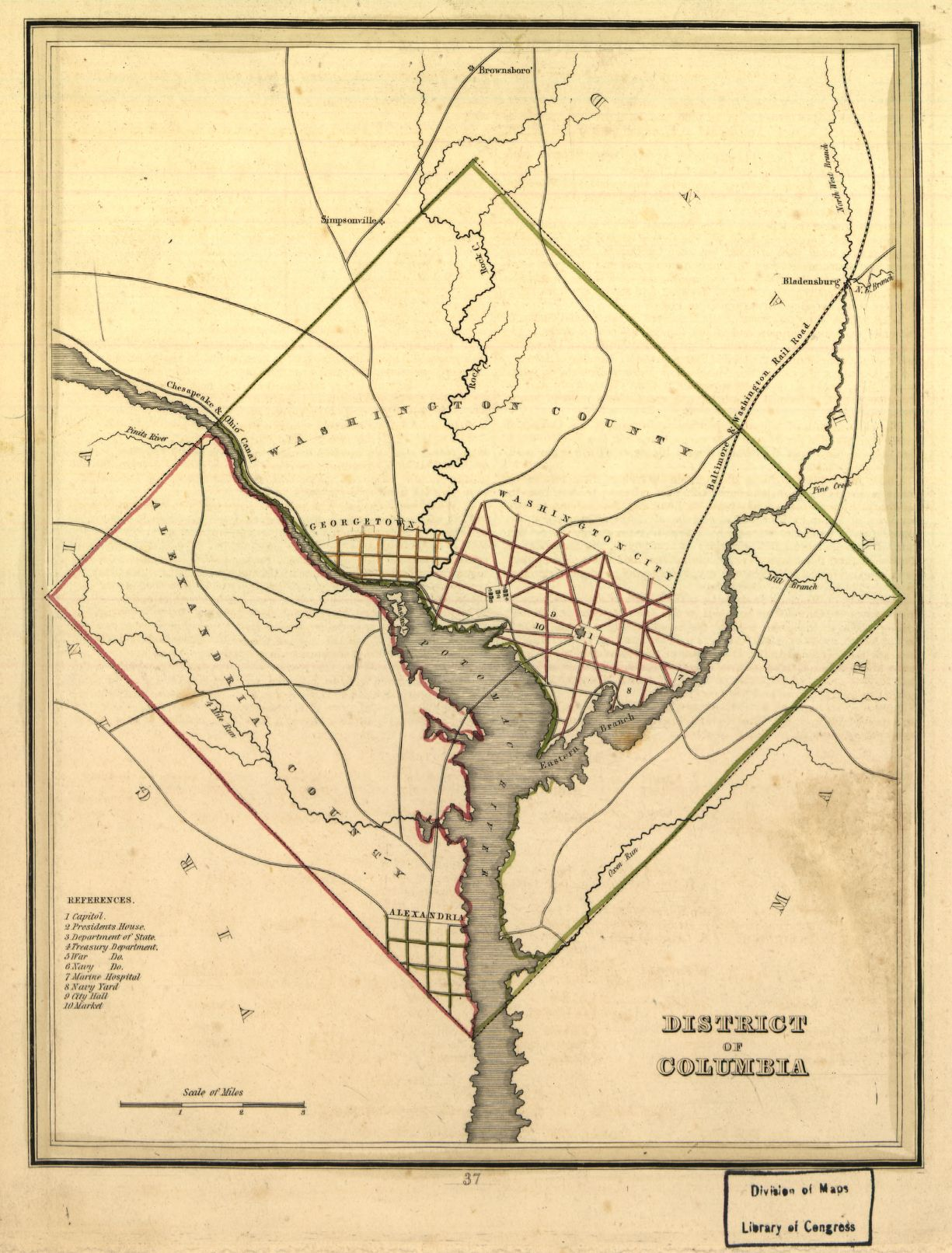
Map of the District, 1835

=== Governing bodies ===
As specified by Article One of the United States Constitution, in fact as one of the enumerated powers of section 8, Congress assumed direct administrative control of the federal district upon its creation by the District of Columbia Organic Act of 1801. There was no district governor or executive body. The U.S. House created a permanent Committee on the District of Columbia in January 1808, and the U.S. Senate established its counterpart in December 1816. These committees remained active until 1946. Thus the U.S. Congress managed the detailed day-to-day governmental needs of the district through acts of Congress—an act authorizing the purchase of fire engines and construction of a firehouse, for instance, or an act to commission three new city streets and closing two others in Georgetown.

The five component parts of the district operated their own governments at the lower level. The three cities within the district (Georgetown, the City of Washington, and Alexandria) operated their own municipal governments, each with a continuous history of mayors. Robert Brent, the first mayor of the City of Washington, was appointed directly by Thomas Jefferson in 1802 after the city's organization that year.

The remaining rural territory within the district belonged either to Alexandria County D.C., (district land west of the Potomac outside the City of Alexandria, formerly in Virginia) or to Washington County, D.C., (the unincorporated east side, formerly in Maryland, plus islands and riverbed). Both counties operated with boards of commissioners for county-level government functions. Both counties were governed by levy courts made of presidentially appointed Justices of the Peace. Prior to 1812, the levy courts had a number of members defined by the president, but after that Washington County had 7 members. In 1848, the Washington County levy court was expanded to 11 members, and in 1863 that was reduced by two to nine members.

=== Disenfranchisement ===
The language of the establishing act of 1801 omitted any provision for district residents to vote for local, state-equivalent, or federal representatives.

This omission was not related to any constitutional restriction or, apparently, any rationale at all. Legal scholars in 2004 called the omission of voting rights a simple "historical accident", pointing out that the preceding Residence Act of July 16, 1790, exercising the same constitutional authority over the same territory around the Potomac, had protected the votes of the district's citizens in federal and state elections. Those citizens had indeed continued to cast ballots, from 1790 through 1800, for their U.S. House representatives and for their Maryland and Virginia state legislators. James Madison had written in the Federalist No. 43 that the citizens of the federal district should "of course" have their will represented, "derived from their own suffrages." The necessary language simply did not appear in the 1801 legislation.

The prospect of disenfranchisement caused immediate concern. One voice from a public meeting in January 1801, before the bill's passage, compared their situation to those who fought against British taxation without representation in the Revolutionary War—20 years prior. Despite these complaints the bill went into effect as written. Given exclusive and absolute political control, Congress did not act to restore any of these rights until the 1960s. The district still has no voting representation in Congress, and the decisions of its long-sought local government established in 1973 are still subject to close congressional review, annulment, and budget control.

== Retrocession (1847) ==
Residents of Alexandria saw no economic advantage from being in the District. No federal buildings could be built on the south side of the Potomac, nor did they have representation in Congress. Some resistance was expressed immediately. One leading figure in the fight to retrocede through the 1820s was Thomson Francis Mason, who was elected mayor of Alexandria, D.C., four times between 1827 and 1830. Also Alexandria was a center of the profitable slave trade – the largest slave-trading company in the country, Franklin and Armfield, was located there – and Alexandria residents were afraid that if the District banned the slave trade, as seemed likely, this industry would leave the city.

To prevent this, Arlington held a referendum, through which voters petitioned Congress and the state of Virginia to return the portion of the District of Columbia south of the Potomac River (Alexandria County) to Virginia. On July 9, 1846, Congress retroceded Alexandria County to Virginia, after which the district's slave traders relocated to Alexandria. The district's slave trade was outlawed in the Compromise of 1850. The penalty for bringing a slave into the district for sale, was freedom for the slave. Southern senators and congressmen resisted banning slavery altogether in the District, to avoid setting a precedent. The practice remained legal in the district until after secession, with the District of Columbia Compensated Emancipation Act signed by Lincoln on April 16, 1862, which established the annual observance of Emancipation Day.

== Organic Act of 1871 ==
The District of Columbia Organic Act of 1871 created a single new municipal corporation governing the entire federal territory, called the District of Columbia, thus dissolving the three major political subdivisions of the district (Port of Georgetown, the City of Washington, and Washington County) and their governments. By this time the county also contained other small settlements and nascent suburbs of Washington outside its bounded limits, such as Anacostia, which had been incorporated in 1854 as Uniontown; Fort Totten, dating at least to the Civil War; and Barry Farm, a large tract bought by the Freedmen's Bureau and granted to formerly enslaved and free-born African Americans in 1867.

The newly restructured district government provided for a governor appointed by the president for a 4-year term, with an 11-member council also appointed by the president, a locally elected 22-member assembly, and a five-man Board of Public Works charged with modernizing the city. The first vice-chair of that Board of Public Works was real-estate developer Alexander Robey Shepherd, the architect and proponent of the consolidating legislation. From September 1873 to June 1874, Shepherd would serve as the second, and final, governor of the District.

The Seal of the District of Columbia features the date 1871, recognizing the year the district's government was incorporated.
