= Midnight Judges Act =

1801 US federal law, quickly repealed

Judiciary Act of 1801
- Other short titles: Midnight Judges Act; Circuit Court Act
- Long title: An act to provide for the more convenient organization of the Courts of the United States
- Nicknames: Midnight Judges Act
- Enacted by: the 6th United States Congress
- Effective: February 13, 1801

Citations
- Statutes at Large: 2 Stat. 89

Codification
- Acts amended: Judiciary Act of 1789
- Acts repealed: Repealed by the Judiciary Act of 1802 (2 Stat. 132)

Legislative history
- Introduced in the House of Representatives; Passed the House of Representatives on January 20, 1801; Passed the Senate on February 7, 1801; Signed into law by President John Adams on February 13, 1801

United States Supreme Court cases
- Marbury v. Madison (indirectly)

The Midnight Judges Act (also known as the Judiciary Act of 1801; 2 Stat. 89, and officially An act to provide for the more convenient organization of the Courts of the United States) expanded the federal judiciary of the United States. The act was supported by the John Adams administration and the Federalist Party. Passage of the act has been described as "the last major policy achievement of the Federalists."

Proponents of the act argued that the current judicial structure required too much work from justices of the U.S. Supreme Court. The existing system required the justices to "ride circuit" to inferior appellate courts, in an era of slow and costly travel. The new act replaced the requirement with additional appellate court justices.

Opponents of the act argued that there was no need to expand the federal judiciary; that the judicial appointments were intended to cement Federalist Party control of the judiciary; and that appointments were rushed (hence they were stigmatized as "midnight appointments").

The act was repealed by the incoming Thomas Jefferson administration on January 22, 1802, and then partially replaced in the Judiciary Act of 1802.

== Background ==
In part, the act represented an effort to solve a recurrent concern about the workload of U.S. Supreme Court justices. Since the establishment of the Supreme Court in 1789, justices were required to "ride circuit" and reiterate decisions made in the appellate level courts. The Supreme Court justices had often expressed concern and suggested that the judges of the Supreme and circuit courts be divided. Attempts to solve this situation before and throughout the presidency of John Adams were overshadowed by more pressing foreign and domestic issues that occupied Congress during the early years of the nation's development.

During the 1800 elections, the US experienced an intense growth in partisan politics. The campaign leading up to this election and the election itself revealed sharp divisions within the ruling Federalist Party. Alexander Hamilton and the extreme Federalists attacked then-President Adams for his pacific relationship with Revolutionary France, opposition to a national army, and poor enforcement of the Alien and Sedition Acts.

With the Federalists split, the election results favored the Democratic-Republican Party. Democratic-Republicans won control of the Senate, and tied the Presidential Electoral College. The House of Representatives, dominated by Hamilton's wing of the Federalist party, eventually decided the presidential election in favor of Democratic-Republican Thomas Jefferson, rather than Adams-aligned Aaron Burr.

The elections thus marked the first peaceful transition of political orientation within the country's leadership. Federalists openly panicked that the new Democratic-Republican administration might destroy the still-fragile constitutional order.

Nevertheless, Jefferson would not be inaugurated until March 4, 1801. In the interim, the Federalists openly reorganized the nation's court system to cement their control, via the Judiciary Act of 1801.

== Effect on judicial divisions and authority ==
SEC. 3. And be it further enacted, That from and after the next vacancy that shall happen in the said court, it shall consist of five justices only; that is to say, of one chief justice, and four associate justices.

— Midnight Judges Act

The act became law on February 13, 1801 and reduced the number of seats on the Supreme Court from 6 to 5, effective upon the next vacancy in the court. No such vacancy occurred during the brief period the act was in effect, so the size of the court remained unchanged; but if it had, the act would have deprived Jefferson of the chance to nominate a replacement.

The act also created 16 new judgeships that John Adams rapidly began to fill in the last weeks of his presidency. These judges came to be known as the "Midnight Judges" (see § The Midnight Judges).

The act reorganized the circuit courts, doubling them in number from three to six, and created three new circuit judgeships for each circuit (except the sixth, which received only one circuit judge). In addition to creating new lifetime posts for Federal judges, the circuit judgeships were intended to relieve the Justices of the Supreme Court from the hardships of riding circuit (that is, sitting as judges on the circuit courts).

The act also reorganized the district courts, creating ten. These courts were to be presided over by the existing district judges in most cases. In addition to subdividing several of the existing district courts, it created the District of Ohio which covered the Northwest and Indiana Territories, and the District of Potomac from the District of Columbia and pieces of Maryland and Virginia, which was the first time a federal judicial district crossed state lines. However, the district courts for Kentucky and Tennessee were abolished, and their judges reassigned to the circuit courts.

In addition, it gave the circuit courts jurisdiction to hear "all cases in law or equity, arising under the constitution and laws of the United States, and treaties made, or which shall be made, under their authority." This form of jurisdiction, now known as federal question jurisdiction, had not previously been granted to the federal courts.

== The Midnight Judges ==
In the 19 days between passage of this act and the conclusion of his administration, President Adams quickly filled as many of the newly created circuit judgeships as possible. The new judges were known as the Midnight Judges because Adams was said to be signing their appointments at midnight prior to President Thomas Jefferson's inauguration. The famous Supreme Court case of Marbury v. Madison involved one of these "midnight" appointments, although it was an appointment of a justice of the peace for the District of Columbia—which was authorized under a different Act of Congress, not the Judiciary Act.

=== Marbury v. Madison ===
The implications of Adams's actions in appointing Federalists to the Supreme Court and the federal courts, led to one of the most important decisions in American judicial history. Marbury v. Madison solidified the United States' system of checks and balances and gave the judicial branch equal power with the executive and legislative branches.

This controversial case began with Adams' appointment of Federalist William Marbury as a justice of the peace in the District of Columbia. When the newly appointed Secretary of State James Madison refused to process Marbury's selection, Marbury requested a writ of mandamus, which would force Madison to make his appointment official.

One Supreme Court Justice that Adams had appointed was Chief Justice John Marshall, who declared that the Supreme Court did not have the authority to force Madison to make the appointment official. This statement actually challenged the Judiciary Act of 1789, which stated that the Supreme Court did, in fact, have the right to issue those writs. Marshall, therefore, ruled that part of the Judiciary Act of 1789 unconstitutional because the Constitution did not expressly grant this power to the judiciary. In deciding the constitutionality of an act of Congress, Marshall established judicial review, the most significant development in the history of the Supreme Court.

== Repeal ==
Once in office, President Jefferson and Democratic-Republican legislators set out to rescind the Judiciary Act of 1801 and remove newly appointed Federalists. On January 22, 1802, they repealed the Midnight Judges Act, although it was unclear whether the repeal could be performed constitutionally. The US Constitution guaranteed judges life tenure, but repeal would eliminate various filled judicial positions. In Stuart v. Laird (1803), the US Supreme Court would hold that occupied judgeships could be constitutionally eliminated.

The repeal of the Judiciary Act also ended the brief period of comprehensive federal-question jurisdiction. The federal courts would not receive such jurisdiction again until 1875.

The new Congress then partially replaced the 1801 Act with the Judiciary Act of 1802. The latter again restored a six-circuit structure to the federal appellate judiciary, but along different geographic lines, and weakened the necessity to ride circuit through reduced court quora. The Justices continued to ride circuit until 1879.

=== Impeachment of Samuel Chase ===
Among the repercussions of the repeal of the Judiciary Act was the first and, to date, only impeachment of a sitting Supreme Court Justice, Samuel Chase. Chase, a Federalist appointed to the Supreme Court by George Washington, had publicly attacked the repeal in May 1803 while issuing his charge to a grand jury in Baltimore, Maryland: "The late alteration of the federal judiciary ... will take away all security for property and personal liberty, and our Republican constitution will sink into a mobocracy, the worst of all popular governments."

Jefferson responded to the attack by suggesting to his supporters in the U.S. House of Representatives that Chase be impeached, asking, "Ought the seditious and official attack on the principles of our Constitution ... to go unpunished?" The House took Jefferson's suggestion, impeaching Chase in 1804. He was acquitted by the Senate of all charges in March 1805, with Vice President Aaron Burr presiding.

== See also ==
- Midnight regulations, related term
- Stuart v. Laird (1803)
