= United States v. Simms =

- Supreme Court of the United States

Argued February 17, 1803 Decided February 23, 1803
- Full case name: United States v. Jesse Simms
- Citations: 5 U.S. 252 (more) 1 Cranch 252; 2 L. Ed. 98; 1803 U.S. LEXIS 358

Case history
- Prior: Writ of Error to the United States Circuit Court of the District of Columbia
- Subsequent: Affirmed

Holding
- Private rights of action under Virginia law persist in the District of Columbia

Court membership
- Chief Justice John Marshall Associate Justices William Cushing · William Paterson; Samuel Chase · Bushrod Washington; Alfred Moore

Case opinion
- Majority: Marshall, joined by unanimous

Laws applied
- District of Columbia Organic Act of 1801 The Act of the Assembly of Virginia of 19 January 1798 regarding gambling

United States v. Simms, 5 U.S. (1 Cranch) 252 (1803), was a United States Supreme Court case. It was one of a series of cases dealing with the applicability of previous laws in the newly created District of Columbia.

== Background ==
Prior to the creation of the District of Columbia in 1801, Virginia created a private right of action to enforce most of its criminal statutes. It was illegal in Virginia to operate a billiards parlor, a faro table, or any of a number of other gambling operations from one's house. The law provided that the penalty would be a fine of 150 pounds payable to any party that would file suit against the operator.

When the District of Columbia was formed the acts of Congress that created the district, also created a contradictory legal situation. They held that within the portion of the District of Columbia that had previously been Virginia territory the laws of Virginia would continue to apply. However, it also held that all suits for breach of the peace or other laws within the district must be prosecuted in the name of the United States and that fines would be payable to the United States. This led to a contradiction because the Virginia law, which was supposedly still in force, had no such requirement.

== Decision ==
The Court held that it was the object of Congress not to change in any respect the existing laws further than the new situation of the District rendered indispensably necessary. Thus qui tam remedies enacted before the creation of the District should persist.

== See also ==
- History of Washington, D.C.
- List of United States Supreme Court cases, volume 5
