= Judiciary Act of 1802 =

United States federal law

- Other short titles: Amendatory Act of 1802
- Long title: An Act to amend the Judicial System of the United States
- Enacted by: the 7th United States Congress
- Effective: April 29, 1802

Citations
- Statutes at Large: 2 Stat. 156

Codification
- Acts amended: Judiciary Act of 1789

Legislative history
- Signed into law by President Thomas Jefferson on April 29, 1802

United States Supreme Court cases
- Stuart v. Laird

The Judiciary Act of 1802 (2 Stat. 156) was a Federal statute, enacted on April 29, 1802, to reorganize the federal court system. It restored some elements of the Judiciary Act of 1801, which had been adopted by the Federalist majority in the previous Congress but then repealed by the Democratic-Republican majority earlier in 1802.

The 1802 Act effectively cancelled the 1801 Act's legally-called-for reduction in the size of the Supreme Court. The 1801 Act had provided that the Court's size would be reduced by one Justice to a court of five, by not filling its next future vacancy. Instead, the 1802 Act restored the Court's full-strength size to six members by referring to its then-present membership, which had been unchanged since the passage of the 1801 Act. This reaffirmed full-strength size of the Court as consisting of six Justices would not be changed again until the addition of a seventh seat by the Seventh Circuit Act of 1807:

Be it enacted by the Senate and House of Representatives of the United States of America in Congress assembled, That from and after the passing of this act, the Supreme Court of the United States shall be holden by the justices thereof, or any four of them, at the city of Washington, and shall have one session in each and every year, to commence on the first Monday of February annually, and that if four of the said justices shall not attend within ten days after the time hereby appointed for the commencement of the said session, the business of the said court shall be continued over till the next stated session thereof. (bold added)

— Judiciary Act of 1802

The Act restructured the circuit courts into six circuits, and assigned one Supreme Court justice to each circuit. Unlike the 1801 Act, no new circuit judgeships were created, so the justices were faced with having to return to the practice of "riding circuit" to hold court in each district within their circuit, along with the local district judge, during the majority of the year. No circuit courts were created for the judicial districts of Kentucky, Tennessee, Maine, or the territories, although the 1801 Act would have done so.

Since the circuit courts were now to consist of only two judges, the Act permitted them to certify to the Supreme Court any question of law on which the two could not agree. Also, the district judge was not permitted to hear appeals of his own decisions, so appeals from the district courts were decided by the circuit justice alone. But the most important part of the Act was the provision that a quorum of only one judge was needed to convene a circuit court. As a result, Supreme Court justices could often rely on district court judges to convene circuit courts. With circuit riding largely optional, Supreme Court justices were no longer saddled with what they had previously felt was a tremendous burden. The Act's flexibility proved crucial to the demise of circuit riding, which essentially disappeared by 1840.

The Act also created additional district courts by dividing the District of North Carolina into the districts of Albemarle, Cape Fear, and Pamptico, and by dividing the District of Tennessee into the Eastern and Western Districts of Tennessee. No new judgeships were created for these courts; however, the district judges in North Carolina and Tennessee had to hold court in each district within their state, and the North Carolina judge also had to sit on the circuit court (which, however, continued to sit for the state as a whole, not in the separate district court districts).

The Act established a United States District Court for the District of Columbia, although this court is not the direct predecessor of today's court bearing the same name.

The Act also postponed the dates of the Supreme Court term from the two months of June and December to the month of February of 1803. This effectively cancelled the Supreme Court term for the remainder of 1802.

== See also ==
- Certificate of division
- Stuart v. Laird
