= District of Columbia Organic Act of 1801 =

1801 act of the U.S. congress

- Long title: An Act Concerning the District of Columbia
- Enacted by: the 6th United States Congress
- Effective: February 27, 1801

Citations
- Statutes at Large: 2 Stat. 103

Legislative history
- Signed into law by President John Adams on February 27, 1801

The District of Columbia Organic Act of 1801, officially An Act Concerning the District of Columbia (6th Congress, 2nd Sess., ch. 15, 2 Stat. 103, February 27, 1801), is an organic act enacted by the United States Congress in accordance with Article 1, Section 8 of the United States Constitution. It formally placed the District of Columbia under the control of the United States Congress and organized the territory within the district into two counties: Washington County to the north and east of the Potomac River and Alexandria County to the west and south. The charters of the existing cities of Georgetown and Alexandria were left in place and no change was made to their status. The common law of both Maryland and Virginia remained in force within the district. The act also established the United States Circuit Court of the District of Columbia with jurisdiction over the new counties.

== Subsequent history ==
Evolution of the District's internal boundaries

On May 3, 1802, the City of Washington was granted a municipal government consisting of a mayor appointed by the president of the United States. The portion of the District of Columbia ceded by Virginia was returned to that state in 1846-47. The District of Columbia Organic Act of 1871 replaced the municipal governments of the City of Washington, Georgetown, and Washington County with a single, unified district government for the whole district.

== District voting rights ==
Following the passage of this Act, residents of the District of Columbia were no longer considered to be residents of either Maryland or Virginia. This left district residents unable to vote for members of Congress. They have voted in presidential elections since the adoption of the Twenty-third Amendment in 1961 (which first applied in the election of 1964). District residents are represented in the House of Representatives by a non-voting delegate who can vote in committee and participate in debate, but cannot vote for final passage of a bill in the House. There have been several efforts to give the inhabitants of the district representation, but the United States remains perhaps the only modern republic where residents of its own capital are disenfranchised.

== See also ==
- Residence Act, 1790 Act of Congress that set where along the Potomac River the permanent capital of the United States would be established
- United States v. More (1805)
