= Washington County, D.C. =

Original political entity within the District of Columbia

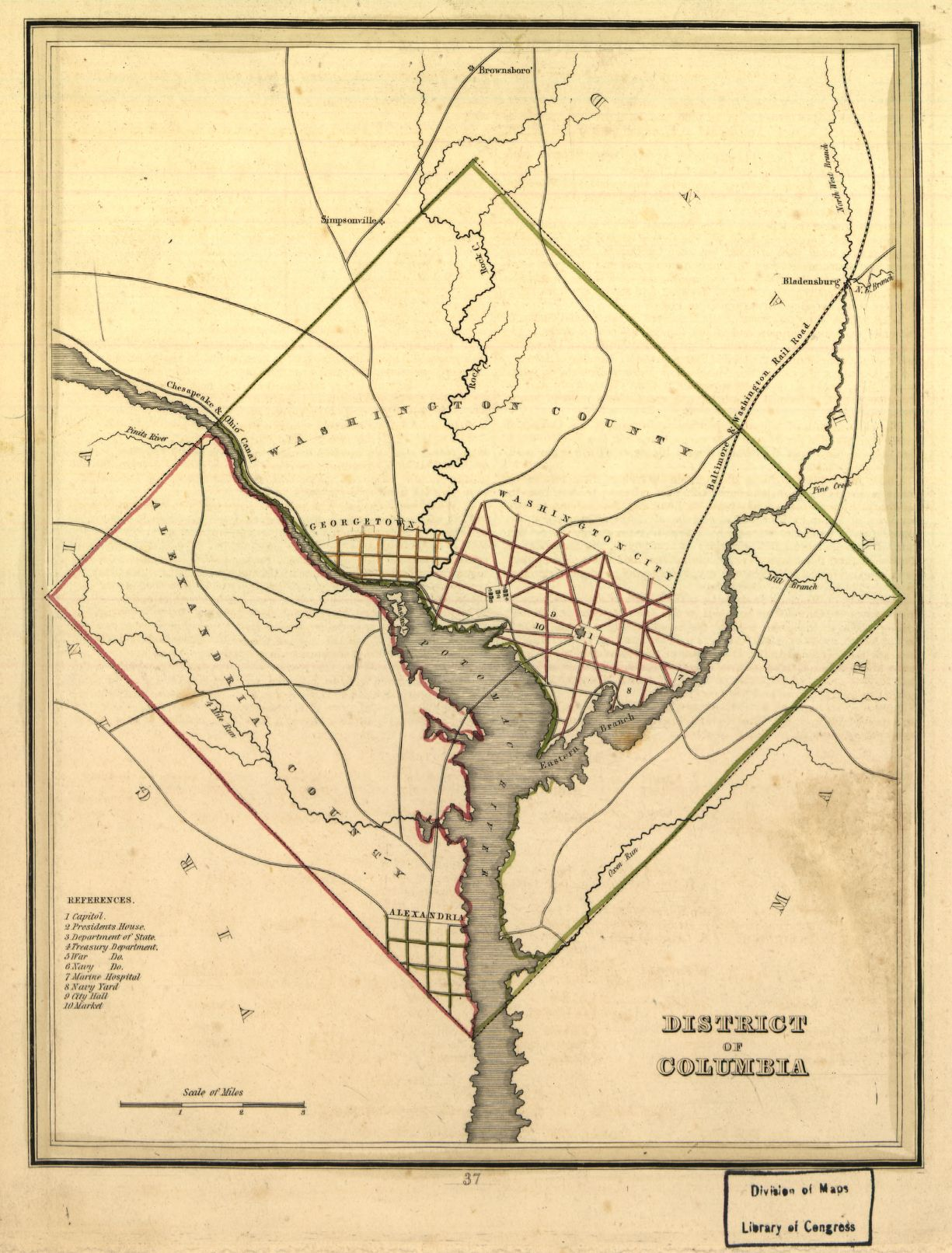
An 1835 map of Washington and Alexandria County in the District of Columbia, prior to retrocession

The County of Washington was one of five original political entities within the District of Columbia, the capital of the United States. Formed by the Organic Act of 1801 from parts of Montgomery and Prince George's County, Maryland, Washington County referred to all of the District of Columbia "on the east side of the Potomac, together with the islands therein." The bed of the Potomac River was also considered to be part of Washington County.

Originally Alexandria County, D.C. formed the portion of the District west of the Potomac River, ceded by the commonwealth of Virginia. Alexandria County, including the City of Alexandria, was returned to Virginia by Congress in 1846, leaving just Washington County. Within Washington County there were two incorporated areas, the City of Washington and the City of Georgetown. At times the rural parts outside of the cities were referred to as "Washington County" but all three were part of the county. Upon the passage of the District of Columbia Organic Act of 1871, the three governments were unified under a single District government and made coterminous, ending Washington County's separate identity.

== Government ==
Starting in 1801, Washington County was governed by a board of commissioners, or a levy court, made up all of the Justices of the Peace, or magistrates, of the county appointed by the President and the number of those were not fixed.

In 1812, the board was reorganized with seven magistrates, two from east of Rock Creek but outside of Washington City, two from west of Rock Creek but outside of Georgetown, and three from Georgetown, with none from Washington City until 1848 when four members from the city were added.

The board was again changed in 1863 when it was reduced to nine members, three from the city of Washington, one from Georgetown, and five from county lands outside the city.

These justices carried out the duties of county commissioners. Despite being within the federal territory, Congress left Washington County subject to the laws of Maryland.

== History ==
Population in County outside cities
Year	Pop.	±%
1800	1,941	—
1810	2,315	+19.3%
1820	2,729	+17.9%
1830	2,994	+9.7%
1840	3,069	+2.5%
1850	3,320	+8.2%
1860	5,225	+57.4%
1870	11,117	+112.8%

Rural Washington County, the part outside of the cities, included Pleasant Plains, the estate of the Holmead family; Edgewood, home of Treasury Secretary Salmon P. Chase; and Petworth, the estate of Colonel John Tayloe III. Also contained in rural Washington County was the U.S. Soldiers' Retirement Home, where President Abraham Lincoln lived during his summers as president. Despite its comparatively large geographic size, rural Washington County was sparsely populated until the end of the 19th century.

Slavery was legal in Washington County, as it was in Maryland, but it was illegal to import a slave from Alexandria County for sale in Washington County. Slavery was ended in Washington County in April 1862 by the District of Columbia Compensated Emancipation Act.

During the American Civil War (1861–65), Washington County contained a partial circle of defensive fortifications that made Washington one of the most heavily fortified cities in the world at that time. The forts surrounding Union-held territory in Virginia completed the defense circle. The Battle of Fort Stevens, July 11–12, 1864, took place in Washington County.

After the Civil War, many of the old estates in Washington County were sold and developed into suburbs for the growing capital city. Among the earliest developments were LeDroit Park and Mount Pleasant, which eventually became the first "streetcar suburb". Uniontown and Barry Farm, a settlement for freedmen, developed east of the Anacostia River.

Washington County and the cities of Washington and Georgetown were abolished in 1871 following the passage of the District of Columbia Organic Act of 1871. This law brought the entire District of Columbia under the control of a territorial government headed by an appointed governor, an appointed eleven-member council, and a locally-elected 22-member assembly. Two of the eleven council seats were reserved for representatives from the District outside of the cities of Washington and Georgetown. Three years later, Congress abolished the territorial government in favor of direct rule over the District by an appointed three-member commission.

== See also ==
- History of Washington, D.C.
