= Lambdin =

Lambdin is a surname. Notable people with the surname include:

- Dewey Lambdin (1945–2021), American nautical historical novelist
- George Cochran Lambdin (1830–1896), American Victorian artist, best known for his paintings of flowers
- James Lambdin (1807–1889), American born artist, famous for many of his portraits of U.S. Presidents
- Lambdin P. Milligan (1812–1899), lawyer, farmer, and a leader of the Knights of the Golden Circle during the American Civil War
- Stephen Lambdin (born 1988), 13x Multi-National Taekwondo team member from the United States of America
- Thomas Oden Lambdin (1927-2020), scholar of Semitic and Egyptian languages
- William Wallace Lambdin (1861–1916), United States federal judge

== See also ==
- Lambda
- Lambdina
