= Shehee =

Shehee is a surname. Notable people with the surname include:

- Rashaan Shehee (born 1975), American football player
- Virginia Shehee (1923–2015), American businesswoman, civic leader, and patron of the arts

== See also ==
- Resler v. Shehee
- Shehee Stadium
- Sheheen
