= Marbury v. Madison =

1803 landmark U.S. Supreme Court case establishing judicial review

- Supreme Court of the United States

Original jurisdiction Argued February 11, 1803 Decided February 24, 1803
- Full case name: William Marbury v. James Madison, Secretary of State of the United States
- Citations: 5 U.S. 137 (more) 1 Cranch 137; 2 L. Ed. 60; 1803 U.S. LEXIS 352
- Decision: Opinion

Case history
- Prior: Original action filed in U.S. Supreme Court; order to show cause why writ of mandamus should not issue, December 1801

Outcome
- Section 13 of the Judiciary Act of 1789 is unconstitutional to the extent it purports to enlarge the original jurisdiction of the Supreme Court beyond that permitted by the Constitution. Congress cannot pass laws that are contrary to the Constitution, and it is the role of the judiciary to interpret what the Constitution permits.

Court membership
- Chief Justice John Marshall Associate Justices William Cushing · William Paterson; Samuel Chase · Bushrod Washington; Alfred Moore

Case opinion
- Majority: Marshall, joined by Paterson, Chase, Washington
- Cushing and Moore took no part in the consideration or decision of the case.

Laws applied
- U.S. Const. arts. I, III; Judiciary Act of 1789 § 13

Marbury v. Madison, 5 U.S. (1 Cranch) 137 (1803), is a landmark decision of the Supreme Court of the United States that established the principle of judicial review, meaning that American courts have the power to strike down laws and statutes they find to violate the Constitution of the United States. Decided in 1803, Marbury is regarded as the single most important decision in American constitutional law. It established that the U.S. Constitution is actually law, not merely a statement of political principles and ideals. It also helped define the boundary between the constitutionally separate executive and judicial branches of the federal government.

The case originated in early 1801 and stemmed from the rivalry between outgoing president John Adams and incoming president Thomas Jefferson. Adams, a member of the Federalist Party, had lost the U.S. presidential election of 1800 to Jefferson, who led the Democratic-Republican Party. In March 1801, just two days before his term as president ended, Adams appointed several dozen Federalist Party supporters to new circuit judge and justice of the peace positions in an attempt to frustrate Jefferson and the Democratic-Republicans. The outgoing U.S. Senate quickly confirmed Adams's appointments, but outgoing secretary of state John Marshall was unable to deliver all of the new judges' commissions before Adams's departure and Jefferson's inauguration. Jefferson believed the undelivered commissions were void and instructed his secretary of state, James Madison, not to deliver them. One of the undelivered commissions belonged to William Marbury, a Maryland businessman who had been a strong supporter of Adams and the Federalists. In late 1801, after Madison had repeatedly refused to deliver his commission, Marbury filed a lawsuit in the Supreme Court asking the court to issue a writ of mandamus forcing Madison to deliver his commission.

In an opinion written by Marshall who, by then, had been appointed Chief Justice of the United States, the Supreme Court held that Madison's refusal to deliver Marbury's commission was illegal. The court also held that it was normally proper in such situations for a court to order the government official in question to deliver the commission. In Marbury's case, however, the court did not order Madison to comply. Examining the law Congress had passed to define Supreme Court jurisdiction over types of cases like Marbury's—section 13 of the Judiciary Act of 1789—the court found that the Act had expanded the definition of the Supreme Court's jurisdiction beyond what was originally set forth in the U.S. Constitution. The court then struck down section 13 of the act, announcing that American courts have the power to invalidate laws that they find to violate the Constitution—a power now known as judicial review. Because striking down the law removed any jurisdiction the court might have had over the case, the court could not issue the writ that Marbury had requested.

== Background ==
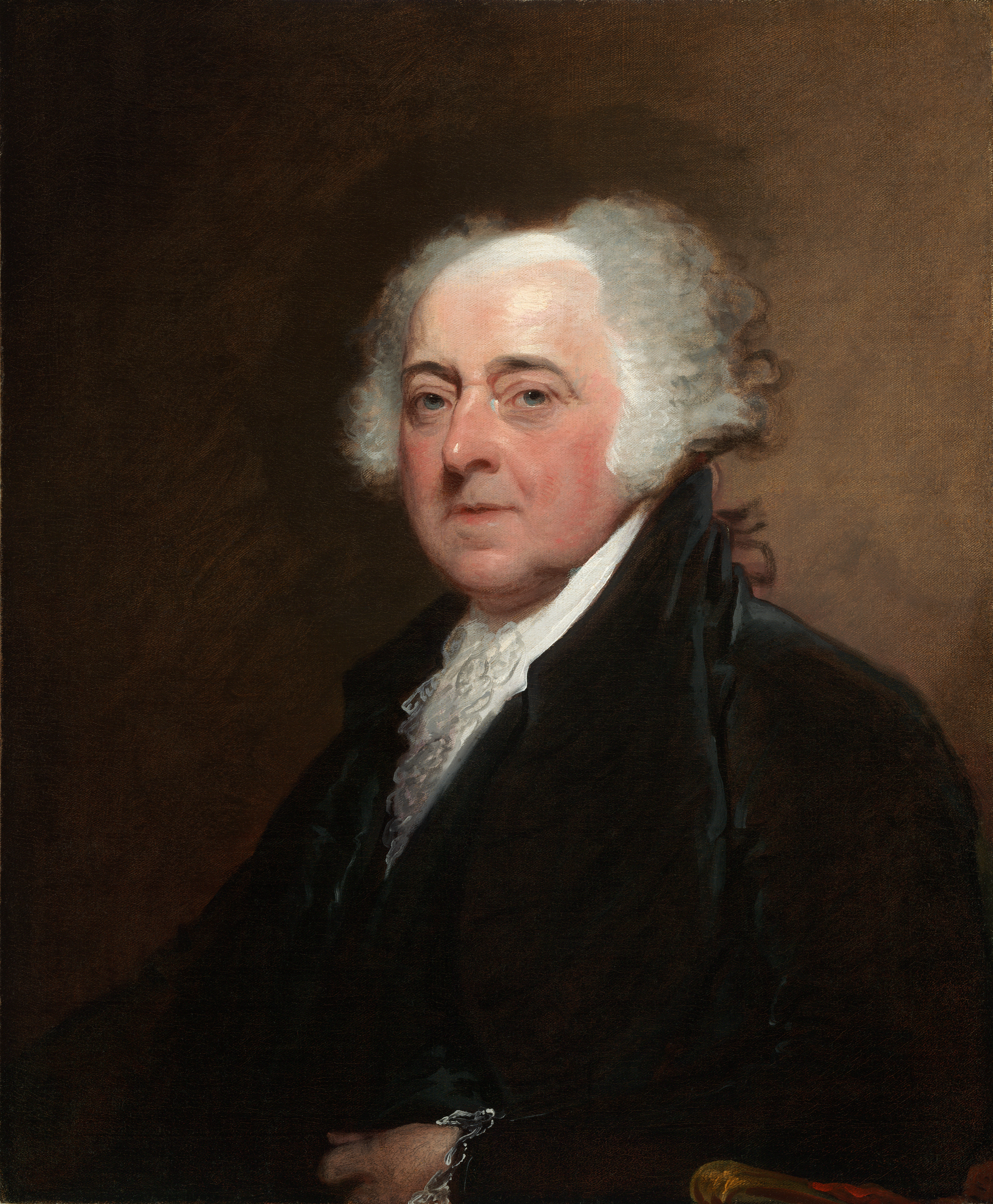
President John Adams, who appointed Marbury just before his presidential term ended.

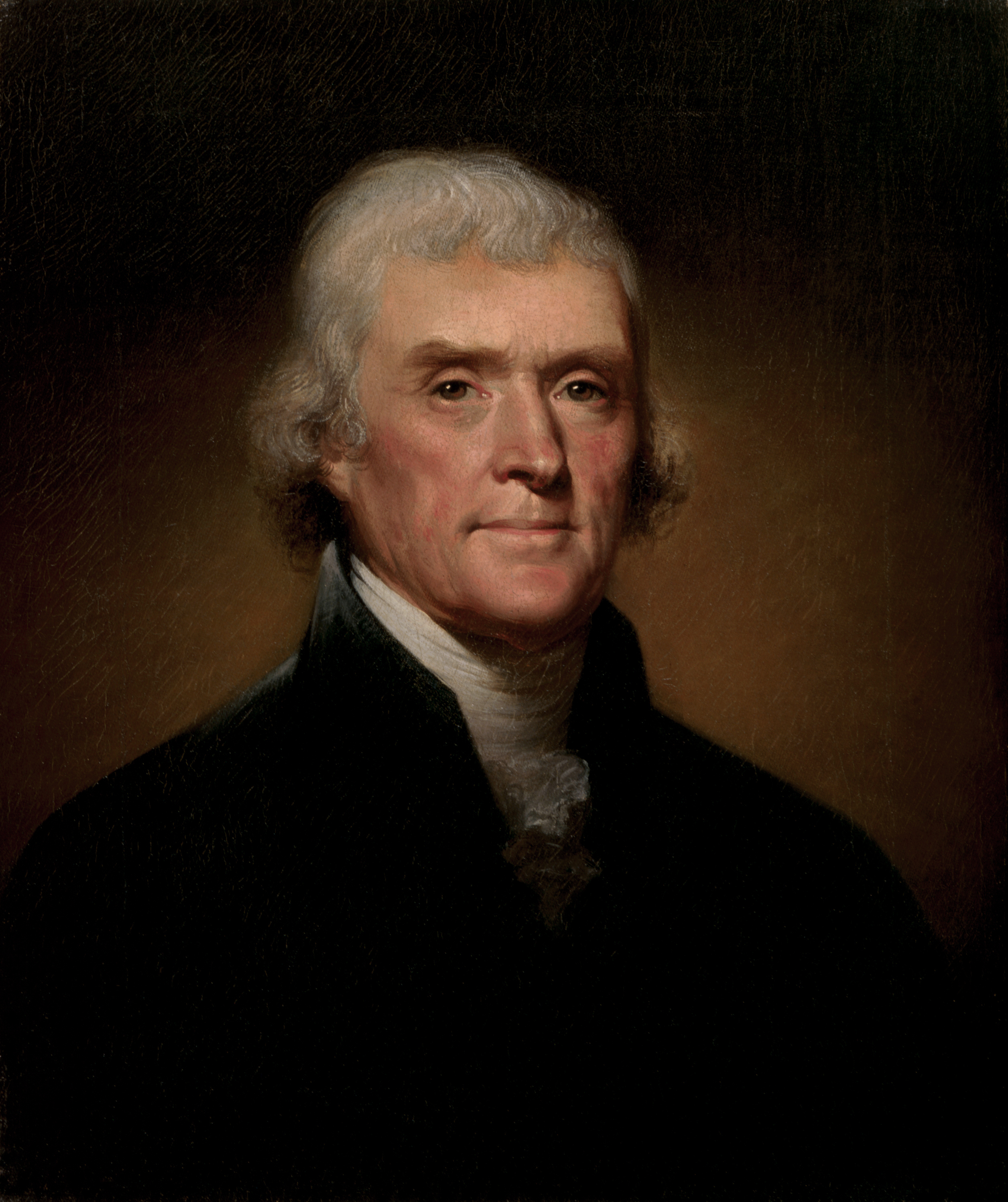
Thomas Jefferson, who succeeded Adams and believed Marbury's undelivered commission was void.

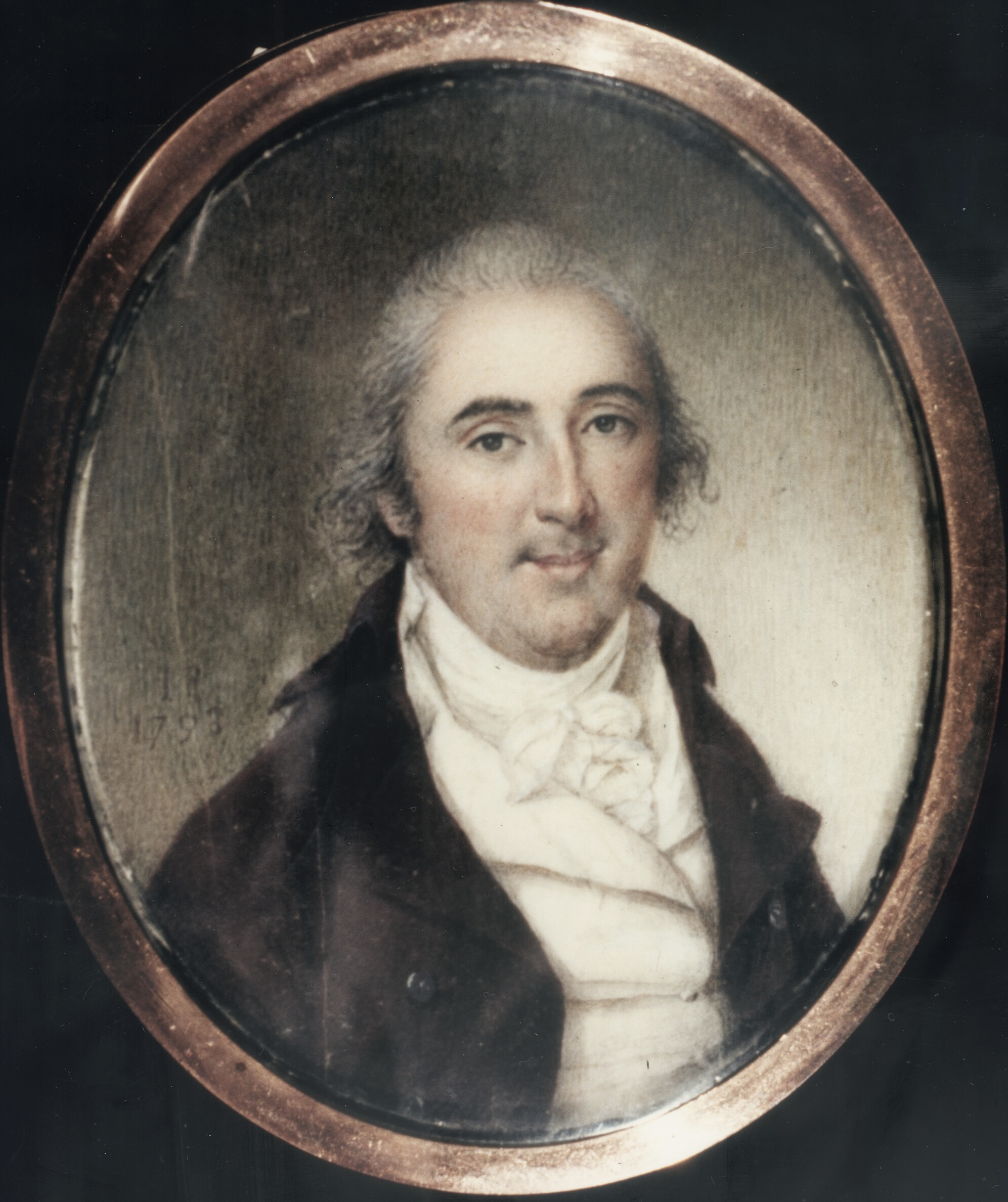
William Marbury, whose commission Madison refused to deliver.

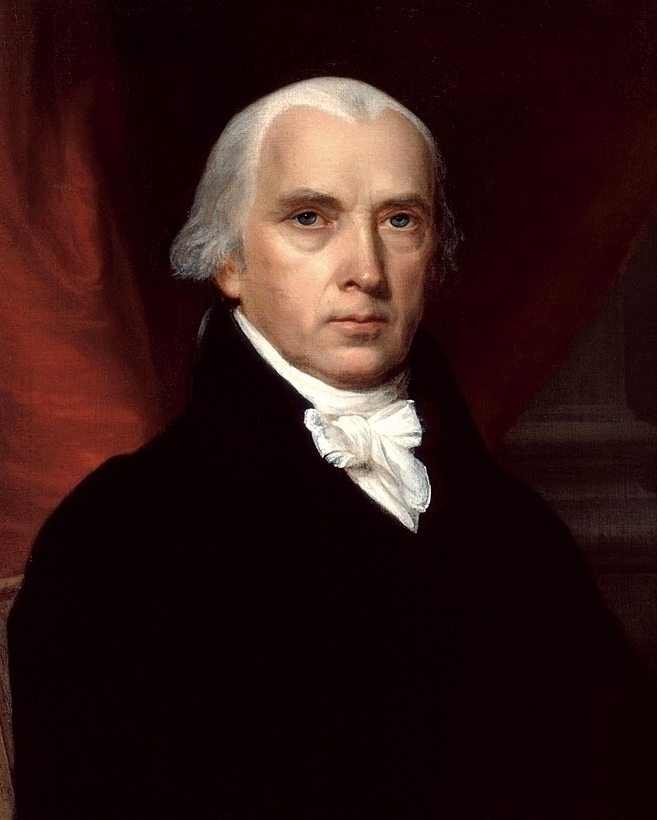
James Madison, Jefferson's Secretary of State, who withheld Marbury's commission.

In the fiercely contested U.S. presidential election of 1800, the three main candidates were Thomas Jefferson, Aaron Burr, and the incumbent president, John Adams. Adams espoused the pro-business and pro-national-government politics of the Federalist Party and its leader, Alexander Hamilton. Jefferson and Burr were leaders of the opposition Democratic-Republican Party, which favored rural agriculture and decentralization. American public opinion had gradually turned against the Federalists in the months leading up to the election. The shift was mainly due to the Federalists' use of the controversial Alien and Sedition Acts, but also due to growing tensions with Great Britain, with whom the Federalists favored close ties. Jefferson easily won the election's popular vote but only narrowly defeated Adams in the Electoral College.

After the results of the election became clear, Adams and the Federalists became determined to exercise their remaining influence before Jefferson took office, and they did everything they could to fill federal offices with "anti-Jeffersonians" who were loyal to the Federalists. On March 2, 1801, just two days before his presidential term ended, (Note: The U.S. Constitution originally had new presidents take office in early March, which left a four-month gap between presidential inaugurations and the elections from the previous November. This changed in 1933 with the adoption of the Twentieth Amendment, which moved presidential inaugurations up to January 20 and thereby reduced the period between elections and inaugurations to about two and a half months.) Adams nominated nearly 60 Federalist supporters to new circuit judge and justice of the peace positions the Federalist-controlled Congress had recently created. These last-minute nominees—whom Jefferson's supporters derisively called the "Midnight Judges"—included William Marbury, a prosperous businessman from Maryland. An ardent Federalist, Marbury was active in Maryland politics and had been a vigorous supporter of the Adams presidency.

The following day, March 3, the Senate approved Adams's nominations en masse. The appointees' commissions were immediately written out on parchment, then signed by Adams and sealed by Secretary of State John Marshall, who had been named the new chief justice of the Supreme Court in January but agreed to continue serving as Secretary of State for the remaining weeks of Adams's presidency. Marshall then dispatched his younger brother James Markham Marshall to deliver the commissions to the appointees. With only one day left before Jefferson's inauguration, James Marshall was able to deliver most of the commissions, but a few—including Marbury's—were not delivered.

The day after, March 4, 1801, Jefferson was sworn in and became the third president of the United States. Jefferson instructed his new secretary of state, James Madison, to withhold the undelivered commissions. In Jefferson's opinion, the commissions were void because they had not been delivered before Adams left office. Without their commissions, the appointees were unable to assume their new offices and duties. Over the next several months, Madison steadfastly refused to deliver Marbury's commission to him. Finally, in December 1801, Marbury filed a lawsuit against Madison at the Supreme Court, asking the court to force Madison to deliver his commission. This lawsuit resulted in the case of Marbury v. Madison.

== Decision ==
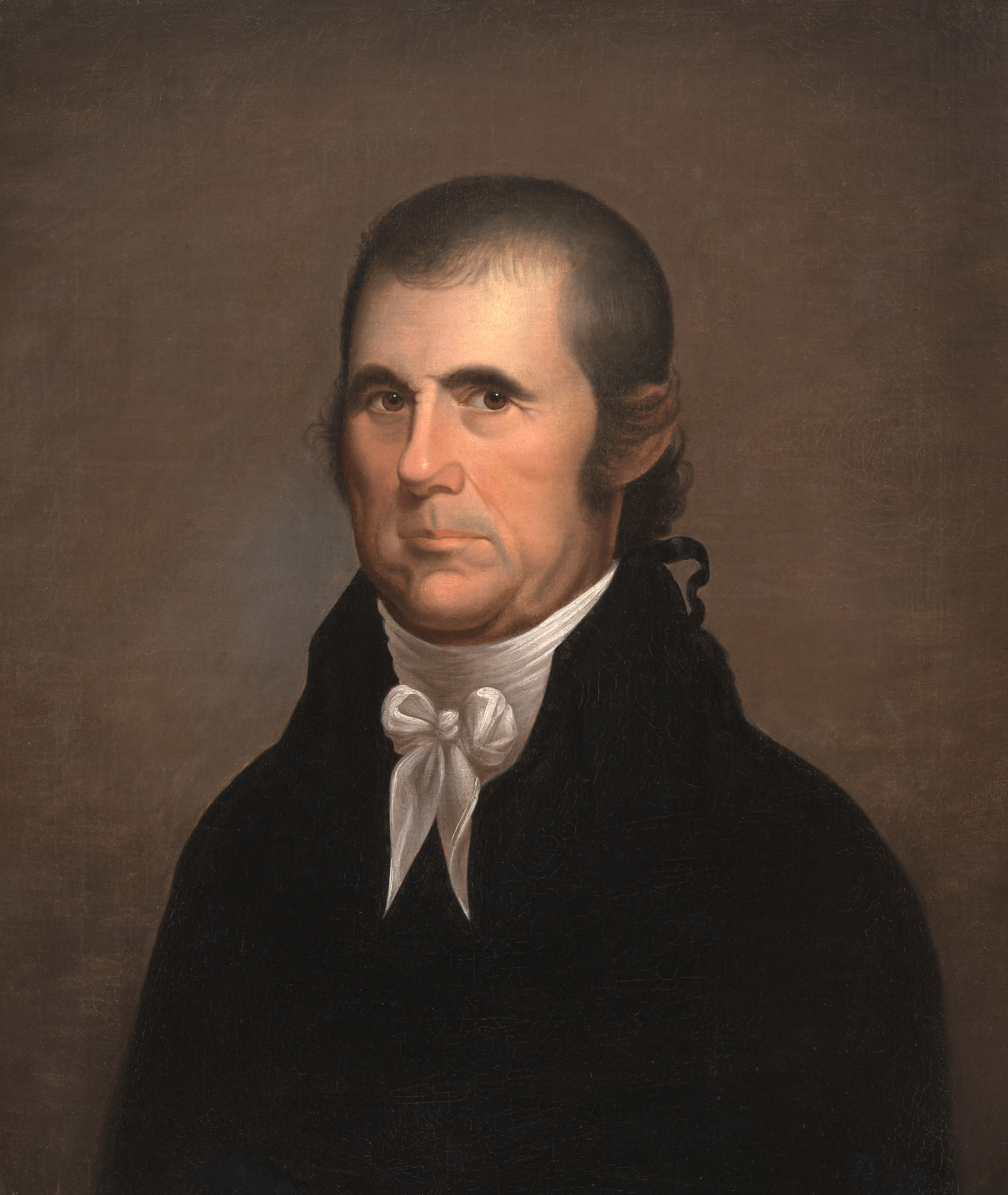
Portrait of Chief Justice John Marshall, the author of the court's decision in Marbury v. Madison, by Cephas Thompson, c. 1809–1810

On February 24, 1803, (Note: There was a year-long delay in hearing and deciding the case. In retaliation for Adams's appointment of the "Midnight Judges", Jefferson and the new Democratic-Republican-controlled Congress passed a bill that canceled the Supreme Court's 1802 term. This prevented all the court's pending cases, including Marbury v. Madison, from being decided until 1803.) the Supreme Court issued a unanimous 4–0 (Note: Due to illnesses, Justices William Cushing and Alfred Moore did not participate in the Court's decision.) decision against Marbury. The court's opinion was written by Chief Justice John Marshall, who structured the court's opinion around a series of three questions it answered in turn:

- First, did Marbury have a right to his commission?
- Second, if Marbury had a right to his commission, then was there a legal remedy for him to obtain it?
- Third, if there was such a remedy, then could the Supreme Court legally issue it?

=== Marbury's right to his commission ===
The court began by holding that Marbury had a legal right to his commission. Marshall reasoned that all appropriate procedures were followed: the commission had been properly signed and sealed. Madison had argued that the commissions were void if not delivered. The court disagreed, saying that the delivery of the commission was merely a custom, not an essential element of the commission itself.

The [President's] signature is a warrant for affixing the great seal to the commission, and the great seal is only to be affixed to an instrument which is complete. ... The transmission of the commission is a practice directed by convenience, but not by law. It cannot therefore be necessary to constitute the appointment, which must precede it and which is the mere act of the President.

— Marbury, 5 U.S. at 158, 160.

The court said that because Marbury's commission was valid, Madison's withholding it was "violative of a vested legal right" on Marbury's part.

=== Marbury's legal remedy ===
Turning to the second question, the court said that the law provided Marbury a remedy for Madison's unlawful withholding of his commission. Marshall wrote that "it is a general and indisputable rule, that where there is a legal right, there is also a legal remedy by suit or action at law, whenever that right is invaded." This rule derives from the ancient Roman legal maxim ubi jus, ibi remedium ("where there is a legal right, there is a legal remedy"), which was well established in the English common law. In what the American legal scholar Akhil Reed Amar called "one of the most important and inspiring passages" of the opinion, Marshall wrote:

The very essence of civil liberty certainly consists in the right of every individual to claim the protection of the laws whenever he receives an injury.

— Marbury, 5 U.S. at 163.

The court then confirmed that a writ of mandamus—a type of court order that commands a government official to perform an act his official duties legally require him to perform—was the proper remedy for Marbury's situation. But this raised the issue of whether the court, which was part of the judicial branch of the government, had the power to command Madison, who as secretary of state was part of the executive branch of the government. The court held that so long as the remedy involved a mandatory duty to a specific person and not a political matter left to discretion, the courts could provide the legal remedy. Borrowing a phrase John Adams had drafted in 1779 for the Massachusetts State Constitution, Marshall wrote: "The government of the United States has been emphatically termed a government of laws, and not of men."

=== The Supreme Court's jurisdiction ===
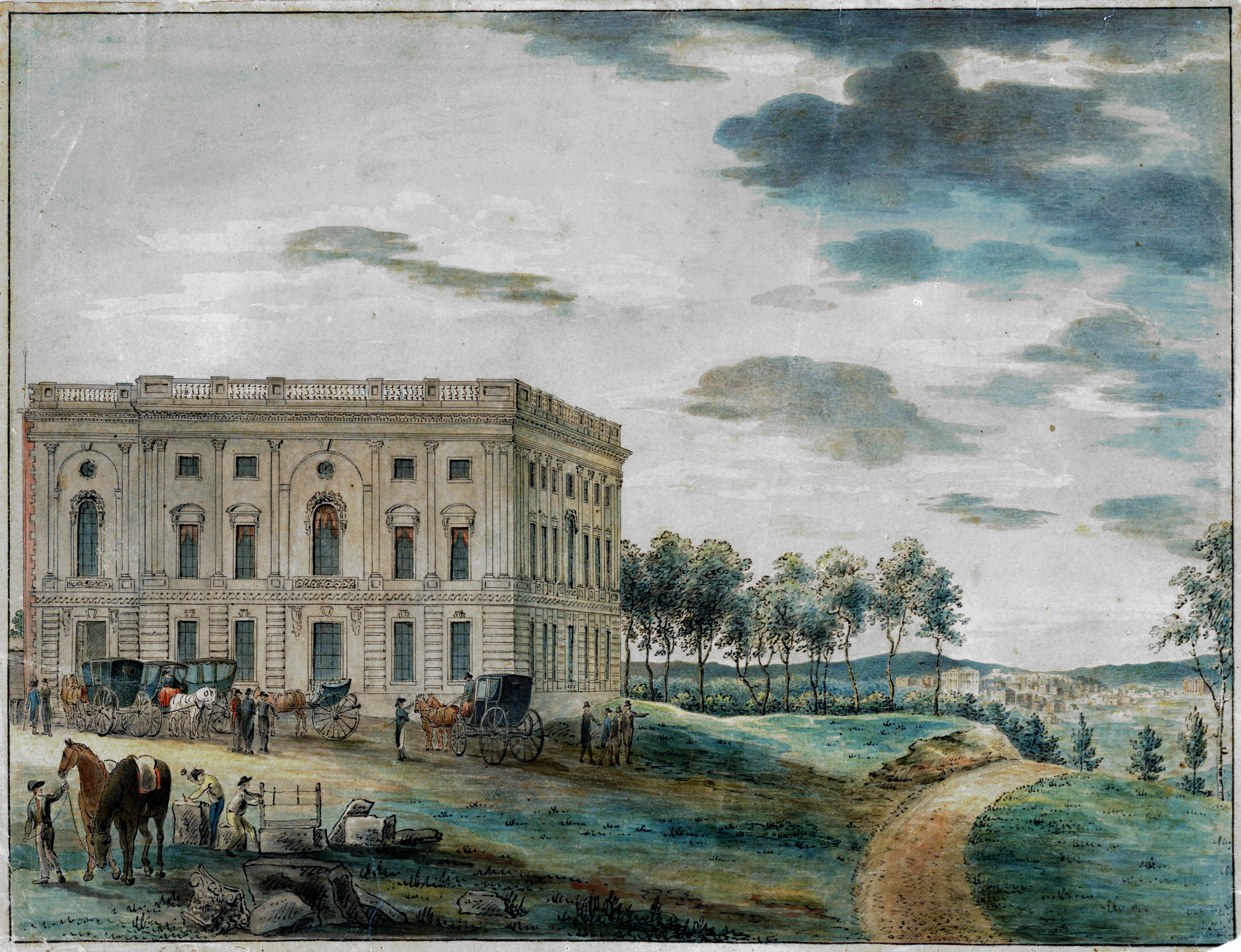
A painting of the U.S. Capitol as it appeared around the time of the Marbury decision (c. 1800). In addition to being the home of the U.S. Congress, the Capitol also housed the U.S. Supreme Court from 1801 until the Supreme Court Building's completion in 1935.

This brought the court to the third question: did the Supreme Court have proper jurisdiction over the case that would allow it to legally issue the writ of mandamus that Marbury wanted? The answer depended entirely on how the court interpreted the Judiciary Act of 1789. Congress had passed the Judiciary Act to establish the American federal court system. Section 13 of the Judiciary Act sets out the Supreme Court's original and appellate jurisdictions.

And be it further enacted, That the Supreme Court shall have exclusive jurisdiction over all cases of a civil nature where a state is a party ... [and] suits or proceedings against ambassadors, or other public ministers ... The Supreme Court shall also have appellate jurisdiction from the circuit courts and courts of the several states, in the cases herein after specially provided for; and shall have power to issue ... writs of mandamus, in cases warranted by the principles and usages of law, to any courts appointed, or persons holding office, under the authority of the United States.

— Judiciary Act of 1789, section 13

Marbury had argued that the wording of section 13 had given the Supreme Court the authority to issue writs of mandamus when hearing cases under exclusive (original) jurisdiction, not only under appellate jurisdiction. As Marshall explains in the opinion, original jurisdiction gives a court the power to be the first to hear and decide a case; appellate jurisdiction gives a court the power to hear an appeal from a lower court's decision and to "revise and correct" the previous decision. The portion of section 13 that speaks of the court's power to issue writs of mandamus appears after its sentence on appellate jurisdiction, not with the earlier sentences on original jurisdiction, but a semicolon separates it from the clause on appellate jurisdiction. Section 13 does not make clear whether the mandamus clause was intended to be read as part of the appellate clause or on its own—in the opinion, Marshall quoted only the end of the section—and the wording of the law can plausibly be read either way.

In the end, the court agreed with Marbury and interpreted section 13 of the Judiciary Act to have authorized the court to exercise original jurisdiction over cases involving disputes over writs of mandamus. This interpretation, however, meant that the Judiciary Act conflicted with article III of the Constitution. Article III defines the Supreme Court's jurisdiction as follows:

In all Cases affecting Ambassadors, other public Ministers and Consuls, and those in which a State shall be Party, the supreme Court shall have original Jurisdiction. In all the other Cases before mentioned, the supreme Court shall have appellate Jurisdiction, both as to Law and Fact, with such Exceptions, and under such Regulations as the Congress shall make.

— U.S. Constitution, article III, section 2 (emphasis added).

Article III says that the Supreme Court has original jurisdiction only in cases where a U.S. state is a party to a lawsuit or where a lawsuit involves foreign dignitaries. Neither of these categories covered Marbury's lawsuit, which was a dispute over a writ of mandamus for his justice of the peace commission. According to the Constitution, therefore, the court did not have original jurisdiction over a case like Marbury's.

Because the court had interpreted the Judiciary Act to have given it original jurisdiction over lawsuits for writs of mandamus, this meant the Judiciary Act had taken the Constitution's initial scope for the Supreme Court's original jurisdiction, which did not cover cases involving writs of mandamus, and expanded it to include them. The court ruled that Congress cannot increase the Supreme Court's original jurisdiction as it was set down in the Constitution, and it therefore held that the relevant portion of section 13 of the Judiciary Act violated article III of the Constitution.

=== Judicial review and striking down the law ===
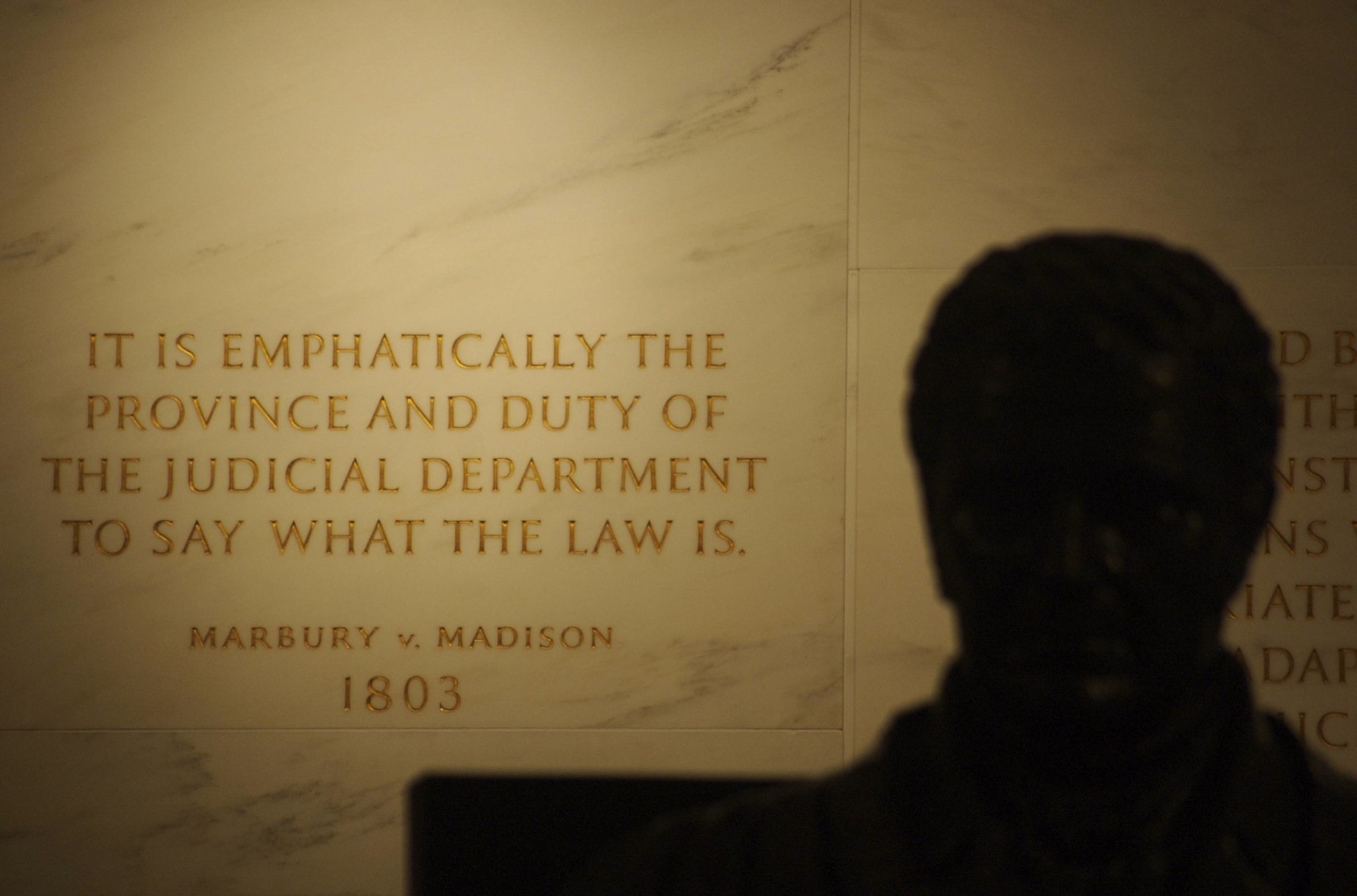
Inscription on the wall of the Supreme Court Building from Marbury v. Madison, in which Chief Justice John Marshall (statue, foreground) outlined the concept of judicial review.

After ruling that section 13 of the Judiciary Act conflicted with the Constitution, the court struck down that section in its first ever declaration of the power of judicial review. The court ruled that American federal courts have the power to refuse to give any consideration to congressional legislation that is inconsistent with their interpretation of the Constitution—a move colloquially known as "striking down" laws.

The U.S. Constitution does not explicitly give the federal judiciary the power of judicial review. Nevertheless, the court's opinion gives many reasons in support of the judiciary's possession of the power. First, Marshall reasoned that the written nature of the Constitution inherently established judicial review. Borrowing from Alexander Hamilton's essay Federalist No. 78, Marshall wrote:

The powers of the legislature are defined and limited; and that those limits may not be mistaken or forgotten, the constitution is written. ... Certainly all those who have framed written constitutions contemplate them as forming the fundamental and paramount law of the nation, and consequently the theory of every such government must be, that an act of the legislature, repugnant to the constitution, is void.

— Marbury, 5 U.S. at 176–77.

Second, the court declared that deciding the constitutionality of the laws it applies is an inherent part of the American judiciary's role. In what has become the most famous and most frequently quoted line of the opinion, Marshall wrote:

It is emphatically the province and duty of the judicial department to say what the law is.

— Marbury, 5 U.S. at 177.

Marshall reasoned that the Constitution places limits on the American government's powers, and that those limits would be meaningless unless they were subject to judicial review and enforcement. He reasoned that the provisions of the Constitution that limit Congress's power—such as the prohibitions on ex post facto laws and bills of attainder—meant that in some cases judges would be forced to choose between enforcing the Constitution or following Congress. Marshall held "virtually as a matter of iron logic" that in the event of conflict between the Constitution and statutory laws passed by Congress, constitutional law must be supreme.

Third, the court said that denying the supremacy of the Constitution over Congress's acts would mean that "courts must close their eyes on the constitution, and see only the law." This, Marshall wrote, would make Congress omnipotent, because none of the laws it passed would ever be invalid.

This doctrine ... would declare, that if the legislature shall do what is expressly forbidden, such act, notwithstanding the express prohibition, is in reality effectual. It would be giving to the legislature a practical and real omnipotence, with the same breath which professes to restrict their powers within narrow limits.

— Marbury, 5 U.S. at 178.

Marshall then gave several other reasons in favor of judicial review. He reasoned that the authorization in Article III of the Constitution that the court can decide cases arising "under this Constitution" implied that the court had the power to strike down laws conflicting with the Constitution. This, Marshall wrote, meant that the Founders were willing to have the American judiciary use and interpret the Constitution when judging cases. He also said that federal judges' oaths of office—in which they swear to discharge their duties impartially and "agreeably to the Constitution and laws of the United States"—requires them to support the Constitution. Lastly, Marshall reasoned that judicial review is implied in the Supremacy Clause of article VI of the U.S. Constitution, because it declares that the supreme law of the United States is the Constitution and laws made "in Pursuance thereof".

Having given his list of reasons, Marshall concluded the court's opinion by reaffirming the court's ruling on the invalidity of section 13 of the Judiciary Act and, therefore, the court's inability to issue Marbury's writ of mandamus.

Thus, the particular phraseology of the Constitution of the United States confirms and strengthens the principle, supposed to be essential to all written Constitutions, that a law repugnant to the Constitution is void, and that courts, as well as other departments, are bound by that instrument. The rule must be discharged.

— Marbury, 5 U.S. at 180.

== Analysis ==
=== Political dilemma ===
John Marshall, c. 1832–1889 portrait by James Lambdin after Henry Inman, after having presided over the American federal judiciary for more than 30 years.

Besides its legal issues, the case of Marbury v. Madison also created a difficult political dilemma for John Marshall and the Supreme Court. If the court had ruled in Marbury's favor and issued a writ of mandamus ordering Madison to deliver Marbury's commission, then Jefferson and Madison would probably have simply ignored the writ. This would have made the court look impotent and emphasized the shakiness of the early American judiciary. On the other hand, a simple ruling against Marbury would have given Jefferson and the Democratic-Republicans a clear political victory over the Federalists.

Marshall solved both problems. First, he had the court rule that Madison's withholding of Marbury's commission was illegal, which pleased the Federalists. Then, however, he also ruled that the court could not grant Marbury his requested writ of mandamus, which gave Jefferson and the Democratic-Republicans the result they desired. Lastly, in what the American legal scholar Laurence Tribe calls "an oft-told tale ... [that] remains awe-inspiring", Marshall had the court rule in a way that maneuvered Marbury's simple petition for a writ of mandamus into a case that presented a question that went to the heart of American constitutional law itself. The American political historian Robert G. McCloskey described:

[Marbury v. Madison] is a masterwork of indirection, a brilliant example of Marshall's capacity to sidestep danger while seeming to court it. ... The danger of a head-on clash with the Jeffersonians was averted by the denial of jurisdiction: but, at the same time, the declaration that the commission was illegally withheld scotched any impression that the Court condoned the administration's behavior. These negative maneuvers were artful achievements in their own right. But the touch of genius is evident when Marshall, not content with having rescued a bad situation, seizes the occasion to set forth the doctrine of judicial review. It is easy for us to see in retrospect that the occasion was golden, ... but only a judge of Marshall's discernment could have recognized it.

Marshall had been looking for a case suitable for introducing judicial review and was eager to use the situation in Marbury to establish his claim. He introduced judicial review—a move Jefferson decried—but used it to strike down a provision of a law that he read to have expanded the Supreme Court's powers, and thereby produced Jefferson's hoped-for result of Marbury losing his case. Marshall "seized the occasion to uphold the institution of judicial review, but he did so in the course of reaching a judgment that his political opponents could neither defy nor protest." Although Jefferson criticized the court's decision, he accepted it, and Marshall's opinion in Marbury "articulate[d] a role for the federal courts that survives to this day." The American legal scholar Erwin Chemerinsky concludes: "The brilliance of Marshall's opinion cannot be overstated."

=== Legal criticism ===
The Supreme Court's historic decision in Marbury v. Madison continues to be the subject of critical analysis and inquiry. In a 1955 Harvard Law Review article, U.S. Supreme Court Justice Felix Frankfurter emphasized that one can criticize Marshall's opinion in Marbury without demeaning it: "The courage of Marbury v. Madison is not minimized by suggesting that its reasoning is not impeccable and its conclusion, however wise, not inevitable."

Criticisms of Marshall's opinion in Marbury usually fall into two general categories. First, some criticize the way Marshall "strove" to reach the conclusion that the U.S. Supreme Court has constitutional authority over the other branches of the U.S. government. Today, American courts generally follow the principle of "constitutional avoidance": if a certain interpretation of a law raises constitutional problems, they prefer to use alternative interpretations that avoid these problems, as long as the alternative interpretations are plausible. In Marbury, Marshall could have avoided the constitutional questions through different legal rulings. If the court had ruled that Marbury did not have a right to his commission until it was delivered, or if he had ruled that refusals to honor political appointments could only be remedied through the political process and not the judicial process, then it would have disposed of the case immediately and the court would not have reached the case's constitutional issues. Marshall did not do so, and many legal scholars have criticized him for it. Some scholars have responded that the "constitutional avoidance" principle did not exist in 1803 and that it is "only a general guide for Court action", not an "ironclad rule". Alternatively, it has also been argued that the claim that Marshall "strove" to create a controversy largely vanishes when the case is viewed from the legal perspective of the late 18th century when American colonies' and states' supreme courts were largely modeled on England's Court of King's Bench, which inherently possessed mandamus powers.

Second, Marshall's arguments for the court's authority are sometimes said to be merely a "series of assertions", rather than substantive reasons logically laid out to support his position. Scholars generally agree that Marshall's series of assertions regarding the U.S. Constitution and the actions of the other branches of government do not "inexorably lead to the conclusion that Marshall draws from them." Marshall's assertion of the American judiciary's authority to review executive branch actions was the most controversial issue when Marbury was first decided, and several subsequent U.S. presidents have tried to dispute it, to varying degrees.

Additionally, it is questionable whether Marshall should have participated in the adjudication of the Marbury case, because he had played a role in the underlying dispute. Marshall was still the acting secretary of state when Adams nominated Marbury and the other "Midnight Judges". He had signed Marbury and the other appointees' commissions and had been responsible for their delivery. This potential conflict of interest raises strong grounds for Marshall to have recused himself from the case. In hindsight, the fact that Marshall did not recuse himself from Marbury is likely indicative of his eagerness to hear the case and use it to establish judicial review.

== Legacy ==
Marbury v. Madison is regarded as the single most important decision in American constitutional law. It established U.S. federal judges' authority to review the constitutionality of Congress's legislative acts, and to this day the Supreme Court's power to review the constitutionality of American laws at both the federal and state level "is generally rested upon the epic decision of Marbury v. Madison."

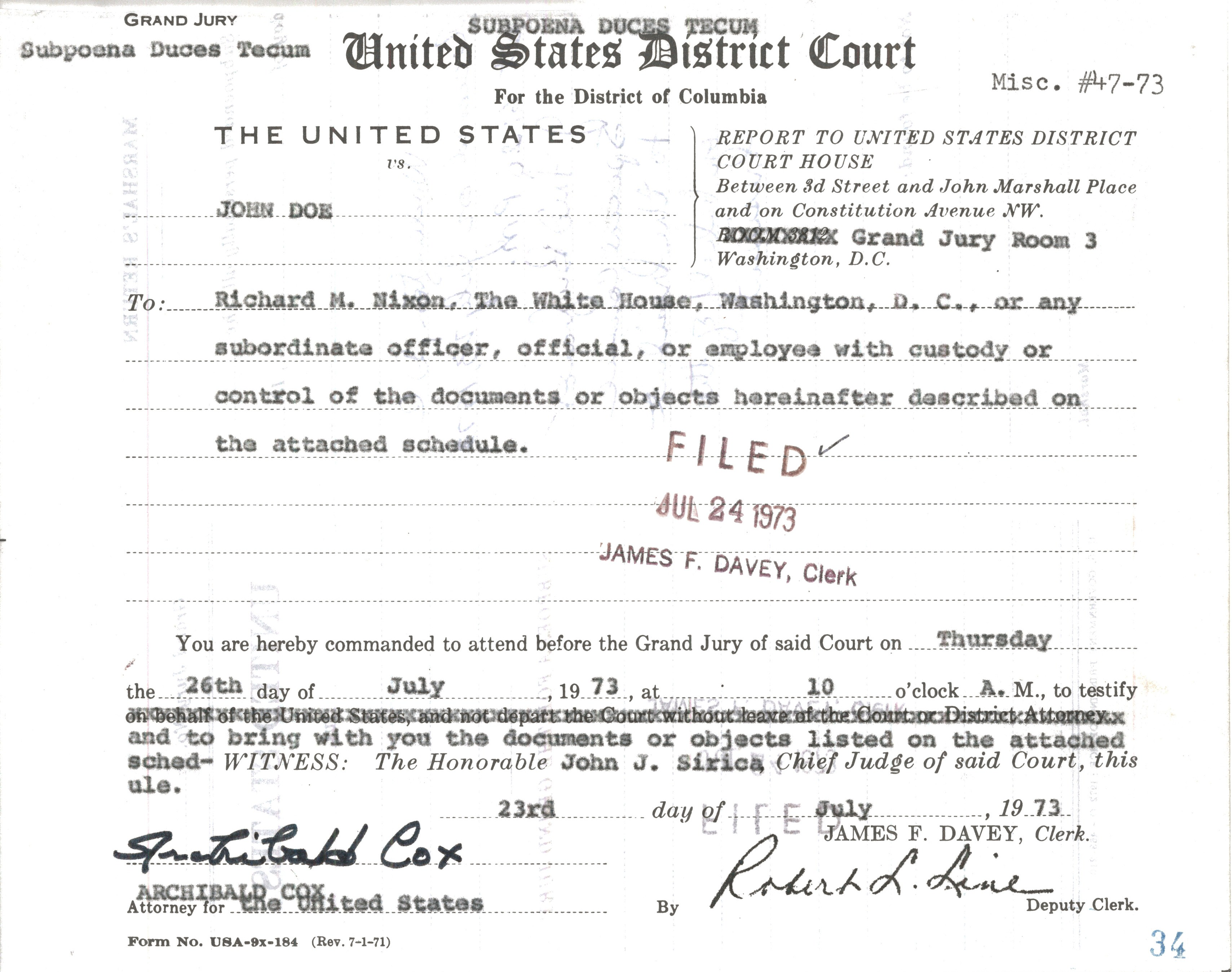
The subpoena duces tecum (order to bring items as evidence) issued to President Richard Nixon that was the center of the dispute in the 1974 judicial review case United States v. Nixon.

Although the court's opinion in Marbury established the power of judicial review in American federal law, it did not invent or create it. Some 18th-century British jurists had argued that English courts had the power to circumscribe Parliament. The idea became widely accepted in Colonial America—especially in Marshall, Jefferson, and Madison's native Virginia—under the theory that in America only the people were sovereign, not the government, and so the courts should only implement legitimate laws. American courts' "independent power and duty to interpret the law" was well established by the time of the Constitutional Convention in 1787, and Hamilton had defended the concept in Federalist No. 78. In addition, the 1796 Supreme Court case Hylton v. United States considered whether a tax on carriages was constitutional, though the court ruled that the statute in question was in fact constitutional and did not actually exercise the power. Nevertheless, Marshall's opinion in Marbury was the Supreme Court's first mention of, and exercise of, that power. It made the practice more routine, rather than exceptional, and prepared the way for the Court's opinion in the 1819 case McCulloch v. Maryland, in which Marshall implied that the Supreme Court was the supreme interpreter of the U.S. Constitution.

Marbury also established that the power of judicial review covers actions by the executive branch—the President and his cabinet members. However, American courts' power of judicial review over executive branch actions only extends to matters in which the executive has a legal duty to act or refrain from acting, and does not extend to matters that are entirely within the President's discretion, such as whether to veto a bill or whom to appoint to an office. This power has been the basis of later important Supreme Court decisions. In its 1974 decision United States v. Nixon, for example, the Supreme Court held that President Richard Nixon had to comply with a subpoena to provide tapes of his conversations for use in a criminal trial related to the Watergate scandal, which ultimately led to Nixon's resignation.

The power of judicial review is a potent check on the other branches of the U.S. government, but federal courts rarely exercised it in early American history. Chemerinsky claims that the Supreme Court did not strike down another federal law until 1857, when it struck down the Missouri Compromise in its now-infamous decision Dred Scott v. Sandford, a ruling that contributed to the outbreak of the American Civil War. However, American scholar Keith Whittington argues that the Supreme Court was significantly involved in evaluating the constitutionality of federal statutes throughout the first half of the 19th century.
