= List of United States Supreme Court cases, volume 5 =

Supreme Court of the United States
- Interactive map of Supreme Court of the United States
- 38°53′26″N 77°00′16″W
- Established: March 4, 1789; 237 years ago
- Location: Washington, D.C.
- Coordinates: 38°53′26″N 77°00′16″W
- Composition method: Presidential nomination with Senate confirmation
- Authorised by: Constitution of the United States, Art. III, § 1
- Judge term length: life tenure, subject to impeachment and removal
- Number of positions: 9 (by statute)
- Website: supremecourt.gov

This is a list of cases reported in volume 5 (1 Cranch) of United States Reports, decided by the Supreme Court of the United States from 1801 to 1803.

== Nominative reports ==
In 1874, the U.S. government created the United States Reports, and retroactively numbered older privately published case reports as part of the new series. As a result, cases appearing in volumes 1–90 of U.S. Reports have dual citation forms; one for the volume number of U.S. Reports, and one for the volume number of the reports named for the relevant reporter of decisions (these are called "nominative reports").

=== William Cranch ===
Starting with the 5th volume of U.S. Reports, the Reporter of Decisions of the Supreme Court of the United States was William Cranch. Cranch was Reporter of Decisions from 1801 to 1815, covering volumes 5 through 13 of United States Reports which correspond to volumes 1 through 9 of his Cranch's Reports. As such, the complete citation to, for example, Talbot v. Seeman is 5 U.S. (1 Cranch) 1 (1801).

== Justices of the Supreme Court at the time of 5 U.S. (1 Cranch) ==
The Supreme Court is established by Article III, Section 1 of the Constitution of the United States, which says: "The judicial Power of the United States, shall be vested in one supreme Court . . .". The size of the Court is not specified; the Constitution leaves it to Congress to set the number of justices. Under the Judiciary Act of 1789 Congress originally fixed the number of justices at six (one chief justice and five associate justices). Since 1789 Congress has varied the size of the Court from six to seven, nine, ten, and back to nine justices (always including one chief justice).

John Marshall became Chief Justice in 1801, remaining in that office until his death in 1835; Marshall is the most influential Chief Justice in the Court's history. When the cases in 5 U.S. (1 Cranch) were decided, the Court comprised these six justices:

Portrait	Justice	Office	Home State	Succeeded	Date confirmed by the Senate (Vote)	Tenure on Supreme Court
	John Marshall	Chief Justice	Virginia	Oliver Ellsworth	January 27, 1801 (Acclamation)	February 4, 1801 – July 6, 1835 (Died)
	William Cushing	Associate Justice	Massachusetts	original seat established	September 26, 1789 (Acclamation)	February 2, 1790 – September 13, 1810 (Died)
	William Paterson	Associate Justice	New Jersey	Thomas Johnson	March 4, 1793 (Acclamation)	March 11, 1793 – September 8, 1806 (Died)
	Samuel Chase	Associate Justice	Maryland	John Blair, Jr.	January 27, 1796 (Acclamation)	February 4, 1796 – June 19, 1811 (Died)
	Bushrod Washington	Associate Justice	Virginia	James Wilson	December 20, 1798 (Acclamation)	November 9, 1798 (Recess Appointment) – November 26, 1829 (Died)
	William Johnson	Associate Justice	South Carolina	Alfred Moore	March 24, 1804 (Acclamation)	May 7, 1804 – August 4, 1834 (Died)

== Notable cases in 5 U.S. (1 Cranch) ==
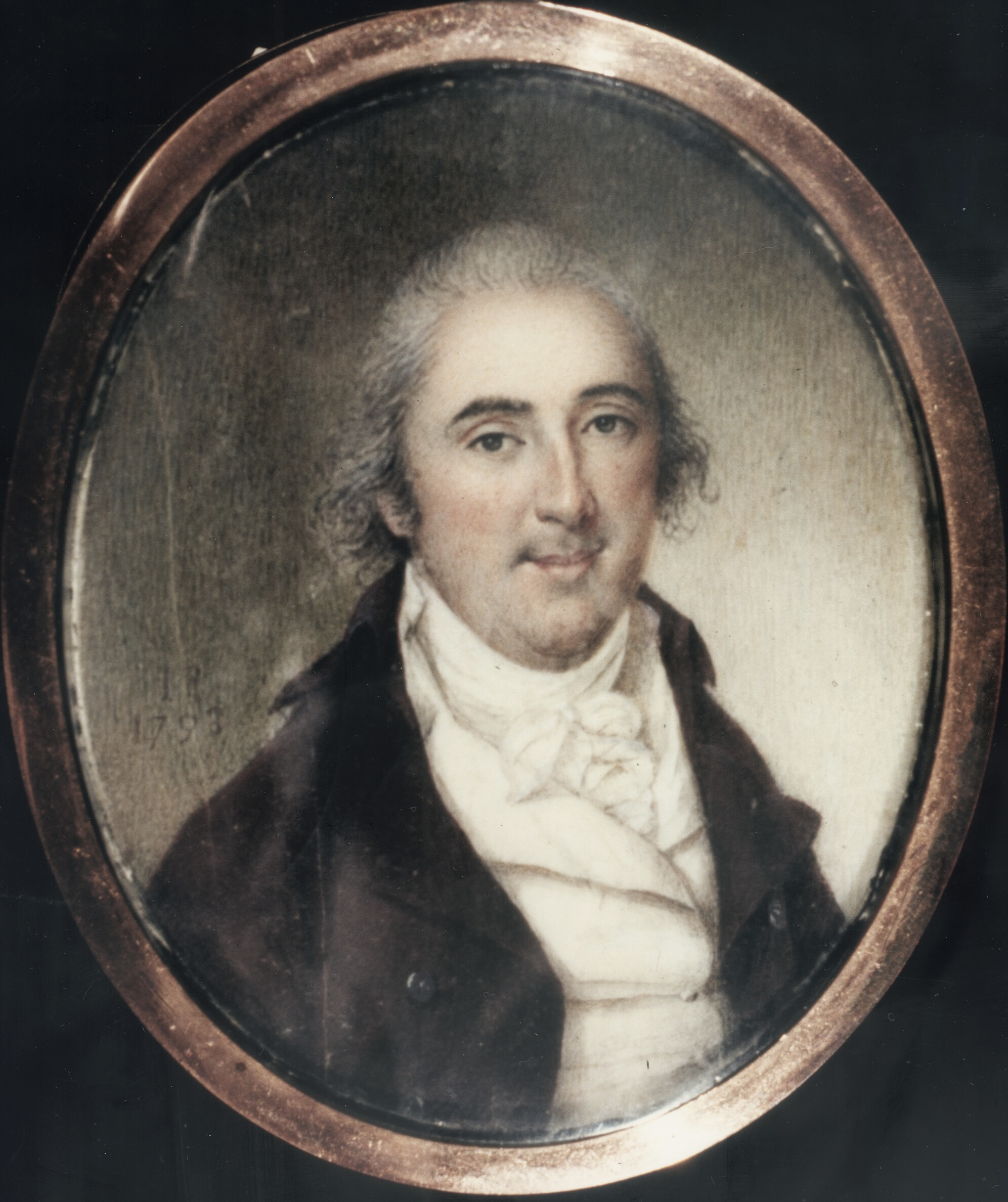
William Marbury

=== Marbury v. Madison ===
Marbury v. Madison, 5 U.S. (1 Cranch) 137 (1803), is a landmark U.S. Supreme Court case that established the principle of judicial review in the United States, meaning that American courts have the power to strike down laws, statutes, and some government actions that they find to violate the Constitution of the United States. Decided in 1803, Marbury remains the single most important decision in American constitutional law. The Court's landmark decision established that the U.S. Constitution is actual law, not just a statement of political principles and ideals, and helped define the boundary between the constitutionally separate executive and judicial branches of the federal government.

=== Stuart v. Laird ===
Stuart v. Laird, 5 U.S. (1 Cranch) 299 (1803), is a case decided by the Supreme Court a week after its famous decision in Marbury v. Madison. Stuart dealt with a judgment of a circuit judge whose position had been abolished by the repeal of the Judiciary Act of 1801. Stuart's lawyer was Charles Lee, who also represented William Marbury. John Laird asked the Supreme Court to uphold the judge's ruling. Stuart's team argued that only the court rendering a judgment could enforce it and that the Judiciary Act of 1802 had been unconstitutional, to which Stuart lost on both accounts. The Court reviewed and upheld the constitutionality of the Judiciary Act of 1802 and averted a dangerous showdown between the legislative and the judicial branches of the United States government.

== Citation style ==
Under the Judiciary Act of 1789 the federal court structure at the time comprised District Courts, which had general trial jurisdiction; Circuit Courts, which had mixed trial and appellate (from the US District Courts) jurisdiction; and the United States Supreme Court, which had appellate jurisdiction over the federal District and Circuit courts—and for certain issues over state courts. The Supreme Court also had limited original jurisdiction (i.e., in which cases could be filed directly with the Supreme Court without first having been heard by a lower federal or state court). There were one or more federal District Courts and/or Circuit Courts in each state, territory, or other geographical region.

Bluebook citation style is used for case names, citations, and jurisdictions.

- "C.C.D." = United States Circuit Court for the District of . . .
  - e.g.,"C.C.D.N.J." = United States Circuit Court for the District of New Jersey
- "D." = United States District Court for the District of . . .
  - e.g.,"D. Mass." = United States District Court for the District of Massachusetts
- "E." = Eastern; "M." = Middle; "N." = Northern; "S." = Southern; "W." = Western
  - e.g.,"C.C.S.D.N.Y." = United States Circuit Court for the Southern District of New York
  - e.g.,"M.D. Ala." = United States District Court for the Middle District of Alabama
- "Ct. Cl." = United States Court of Claims
- The abbreviation of a state's name alone indicates the highest appellate court in that state's judiciary at the time.
  - e.g.,"Pa." = Supreme Court of Pennsylvania
  - e.g.,"Me." = Supreme Judicial Court of Maine

== List of cases in 5 U.S. (1 Cranch) ==
Case Name	Page & year	Opinion of the Court	Concurring opinion(s)	Dissenting opinion(s)	Lower court	Disposition
Talbot v. Seeman	1 (1801)	Marshall	none	none	C.C.D.N.Y.	multiple
Wilson v. Mason	45 (1801)	per curiam	none	none	D. Ky.	reversed
The Schooner Peggy	103 (1801)	Marshall	none	none	C.C.D. Conn.	reversed
Resler v. Shehee	110 (1801)	per curiam	none	none	C.C.D.C.	affirmed
Turner v. Fendall	116 (1801)	Marshall	none	none	C.C.D.C.	affirmed
Marbury v. Madison	137 (1803)	Marshall	none	none	original	rule discharged
Clark v. Young	181 (1803)	Marshall	none	none	C.C.D.C.	affirmed
Wilson v. Lenox	194 (1803)	Marshall	none	none	C.C.D.C.	reversed
Clarke v. Bazadone	212 (1803)	per curiam	none	none	Gen. Ct. N.W. Terr.	writ of error quashed
Hooe and Company. v. Groverman	214 (1803)	Marshall	none	none	C.C.D.C.	reversed
Wood v. Owings	239 (1803)	Marshall	none	none	C.C.D. Md.	reversed
United States v. Simms	252 (1803)	Marshall	none	none	C.C.D.C.	affirmed
Fenwick v. Sears's Administrators	259 (1803)	per curiam	none	none	C.C.D.C.	reversed
Thompson v. Jameson	282 (1803)	per curiam	none	none	C.C.D.C.	reversed
Mandeville v. Joseph Riddle and Company	290 (1803)	Marshall	none	none	C.C.D.C.	reversed
Stuart v. Laird	299 (1803)	Paterson	none	none	C.C.D. Va.	affirmed
Hamilton v. Russell	309 (1803)	Marshall	none	none	C.C.D.C.	affirmed
United States v. Hooe	318 (1803)	per curiam	none	none	C.C.D.C.	certification
Hepburn v. Auld	321 (1803)	Marshall	none	none	C.C.D.C.	affirmed
Marine Insurance Company v. Young	332 (1803)	per curiam	none	none	not indicated	not indicated
Abercrombie v. Dupuis	343 (1803)	Marshall	none	none	C.C.D. Ga.	reversed
Lindo v. Gardner	343 (1803)	per curiam	none	none	C.C.D.C.	reversed
Hodgson v. Dexter	345 (1803)	Marshall	none	none	C.C.D.C.	affirmed
Lloyd v. Alexander	365 (1803)	Marshall	none	none	not indicated	certification

== See also ==
- Certificate of division
