= Sheheen =

Sheheen is a surname. Notable people with the surname include:

- Ralph Sheheen (born 1964), American broadcaster
- Robert Sheheen (born 1943), American lawyer and politician
- Vincent Sheheen (born 1971), American attorney and politician, nephew of Robert

== See also ==
- Shehee
