= Wilson v. Mason =

- Supreme Court of the United States

Argued August 8, 10–11, 1801 Decided December 15, 1801
- Full case name: George Wilson v. Richard Mason, Devisee of George Mason; Richard Mason, Devisee of George Mason v. George Wilson
- Citations: 5 U.S. 45 (more) 1 Cranch 45; 2 L. Ed. 29; 1801 U.S. LEXIS 117

Case history
- Prior: on writ of error to the District Court of Kentucky
- Subsequent: Reversed and annulled, caveat ordered dismissed

Holding
- Under the laws set up by Virginia in 1779 to sell off unused land, a claim to land was valid when the claim was recorded in the county surveyor's office and not at the time the survey was actually performed.

Court membership
- Chief Justice John Marshall Associate Justices William Cushing · William Paterson; Samuel Chase · Bushrod Washington; Alfred Moore

Case opinion
- Majority: Marshall, joined by unanimous

Laws applied
- Virginia land statute of 1779

Wilson v. Mason, 5 U.S. (1 Cranch) 45 (1801), was a United States Supreme Court case. It resolved a dispute between George Wilson and Founding Father George Mason over 8,400 acres (34 km^{2}) of land along the Green River in present-day Kentucky.

== Background ==
In 1779 the General Assembly of the Commonwealth of Virginia enacted a statute that authorized the sale of otherwise unowned land to private buyers. The act held that anyone who deposits 40 pounds into the state treasury is entitled to 100 acres (0.40 km^{2}) of land West of the Ohio River. The purchaser would receive a receipt for the amount of land to which he was entitled. He would then take the receipt to the Land Office and enter a description of the specific land he wanted to claim. Finally the county surveyor would survey the land according to the description entered into the records of the Land Office and record the survey in the county records.

In April 1780 Mason claimed 18,700 acres (76 km^{2}) in two plats along a tributary of the Green River. In October of the same year he restated and clarified his claim with the surveyor. In April 1783 Wilson entered a claim and survey for 40,926 acres (165.62 km^{2}) which included Mason's 8,400-acre (34 km^{2}) plat. The survey of Mason's land was conducted in the fall of 1783. Changes were made to the claim during the survey. Wilson filed suit to prevent the title to the land they both claimed transferring to Mason. He claimed that Mason's claim was too vague and that the survey was not conducted properly.

== The decision ==
The essential issue before the court was one of when the claim was properly made. By the time the Supreme Court heard the case, the land was no longer in Virginia, but was now part of Kentucky. Also, the statutes at issue were passed by the Virginia Legislature prior to the ratification of the United States Constitution. Nevertheless, the court felt bound to interpret the law as it was in 1780. The time-line was thus as follows:

- Mason makes claim to land
- Wilson makes claim to land
- Mason surveys land and in so doing may have changed the original claim

The court ruled that it was the claim and not the survey that was dispositive. Thus, Mason's claim should have been the valid one. However, the Court concluded that the Mason's survey was performed contrary to the claim. Therefore, for Mason's title to be valid, the survey and not the claim must be dispositive.

The Court ruled for Wilson and gave him title over the land in question.

== See also ==
- List of United States Supreme Court cases, volume 5
- Property law
