= Talbot v. Seeman =

- Supreme Court of the United States

Argued August 4–7, 1801 Decided August 11, 1801
- Full case name: Silas Talbot v. Hans Frederick Seeman
- Citations: 5 U.S. 1 (more) 1 Cranch 1; 2 L. Ed. 15; 1801 U.S. LEXIS 116

Case history
- Prior: on writ of error to the Circuit Court of the District of New York

Holding
- A vessel captured from the enemy in wartime is subject to salvage rights even if its owner is not party to the conflict.

Court membership
- Chief Justice John Marshall Associate Justices William Cushing · William Paterson; Samuel Chase · Bushrod Washington; Alfred Moore

Case opinion
- Majority: Marshall, joined by unanimous

Laws applied
- Salvage Act of 28 June 1798

Talbot v. Seeman, 5 U.S. (1 Cranch) 1 (1801), was a United States Supreme Court case. It involved maritime law, specifically the circumstances under which salvage rights attach to a neutral vessel captured by enemy forces and then recaptured by the United States Navy.

== Background ==
The Amelia, a merchant vessel owned by citizens of Hamburg, was captured on the high seas by the French military vessel La Diligente (meaning The Diligent) during the French-American Naval Conflict (1798-1800), also known as the Quasi-War. The vessel was then recaptured during the same period by the USS Constitution under the command of Captain Talbot, who asserted salvage rights over the captured vessel. The Court considered two issues:

1. Whether the recapture by the Constitution was legal
2. Whether meritorious service (a prerequisite for salvage) was performed in the recapture.

The former issue was complicated by two factors. Firstly, an enemy vessel captured in time of war is captured legally. However, the vessel was not an enemy vessel but a vessel legally owned by a non-party to the conflict. Secondly, there was no declaration of war in the conflict between the United States and France.

The Hamburg vessel was on its way to France when it was recaptured by Captain Talbot. Hans Seeman and other owners of the vessel claimed that under the laws of war, the French would have to release it to them and thus Talbot's capture of the vessel did them no service. Talbot claimed that he saved the vessel from adjudication under the laws of France, which could have forfeited the vessel or demanded salvage payment to France.

== Decision ==
The Court held that although there was no declaration of war against France, the United States had authorized the military seizure of French vessels. Since the Amelia was armed and in the possession of the French Navy, probable cause existed and so Captain Talbot had captured it legally.

The Court further held that a meritorious service had been performed in rescuing it from French hands. In exchange for its return to its rightful owners, Talbot and the officers of the Constitution should be compensated.

The court reversed the Circuit Court of New York and ordered the vessel returned to its Hamburg owners upon their payment of salvage in the amount of one sixth of its value.

== See also ==
- List of United States Supreme Court cases, volume 5
