= Elizabeth Robins Pennell =

American author (1855–1936)

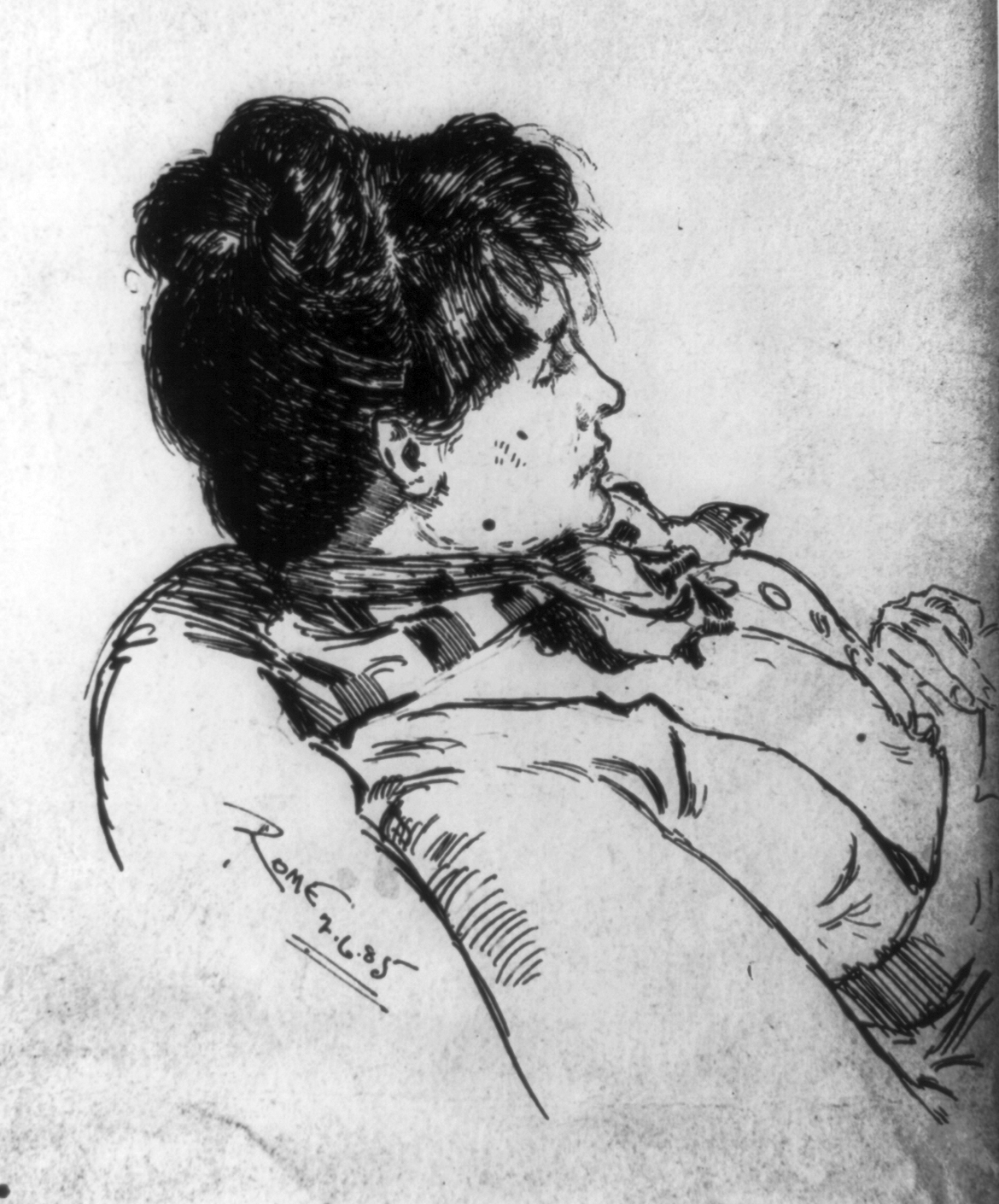
Sketch of Pennell by her husband Joseph

Elizabeth Robins Pennell (February 21, 1855 – February 7, 1936) was an American writer who, for most of her adult life, made her home in London. A researcher summed her up in a work published in 2000 as "an adventurous, accomplished, self-assured, well-known columnist, biographer, cookbook collector, and art critic"; in addition, she wrote travelogues, mainly of European cycling voyages, and memoirs, centred on her London salon. Her biographies included the first in almost a century of the proto-feminist Mary Wollstonecraft, one of her uncle the folklorist Charles Godfrey Leland, and one of her friend the painter Whistler. In recent years, her art criticism has come under scrutiny, and her food criticism has been reprinted.

== Early life ==
She grew up in Philadelphia. Her mother died when she was very young, and she was sent away to a convent school from the ages of 8 to 17. When she returned to her father's home, he had remarried, and she was bored with the demands and restrictions of being a proper Catholic young lady. She wanted to work, and, with the encouragement of her uncle, the writer and folklorist Charles Godfrey Leland, she took up writing as a career. She started with articles in periodicals such as Atlantic Monthly, and through this work she met a young Quaker artist named Joseph Pennell, who had also had to face down parental disapproval to pursue his creative calling. This began a fruitful collaboration between writer and illustrator.

== First book, marriage, move to London ==
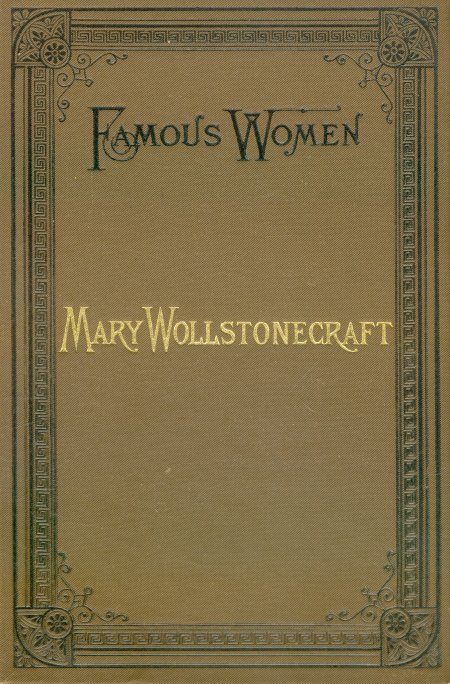
Cover of Mary Wollstonecraft, Pennell's first book

Her first book was the first full-length biography of Mary Wollstonecraft (1759–97) since the hastily published Memoirs of the Author of A Vindication of the Rights of Woman by her widower William Godwin. Pennell's biography drew on three main sources: Godwin's Memoirs; a London publisher named Charles Kegan Paul, who had written a sketch about the husband and wife a few years previously; and a curator at the British Library, Richard Garnett. It was published in 1884 by the Roberts Brothers of Boston, as one of the first in their Famous Women series, and also in London by the Walter Scott Publishing Company.

In June that year, Elizabeth Robins married Joseph Pennell. The couple accepted a travel writing commission from The Century Magazine and set off for Europe, making several cycling journeys, in 1884 from London to Canterbury and then in 1885 through France. Her uncle had travelled widely in Europe and settled in London, and so did the Pennells, basing themselves in the British capital for more than thirty years, with frequent visits to the Continent. They made a good working team, producing many articles and books together, and supporting each other in their work. For many years they opened their home on Thursday evenings as a literary and artistic salon; some of the people who enjoyed their hospitality included: "critics Sir Edmund Gosse and William Archer; artists Aubrey Beardsley and James McNeill Whistler; authors Henry James, Max Beerbohm, Oscar Wilde, and George Bernard Shaw; and publishers John Lane and William E. Henley." Pennell wrote of these gatherings in her memoirs, Our House and the People in It (1910), Our House and London Out of Our Windows (1912), and Nights: Rome & Venice in the Aesthetic Eighties, London & Paris in the Fighting Nineties (1916).

== Her works and their appraisal ==
=== Art criticism ===
Pennell's main work was as an art and, later, a food critic, writing for periodicals including the Daily Chronicle and the Pall Mall Gazette. Scholar Meaghan Clarke ties "real-life women art journalists" such as Pennell to the literary figures and hacks that populate George Gissing's New Grub Street, as well as to the concept of the New Woman. "Like journalism and, one might argue, because of journalism, the London art world was undergoing an intensive popularization during the 1880s and 1890s." Keeping up (as Clarke puts it) "a peripatetic pace in search of copy", Pennell went to Paris in May for the art salons, and regularly visited the London galleries (from Cork Street and Bond Street in the fashionable West End to philanthropic art projects in the slums of the East End) to review the exhibitions. She wrote critically of Walter Besant’s People’s Palace at Mile End (similar in spirit to Samuel and Henrietta Barnett’s St Jude's at Whitechapel).

Kimberly Morse Jones writes that "Pennell's criticism constitutes a vital component of a wider movement in Victorian criticism that came to be known as the New Art Criticism", listing Alfred Lys Baldry, D.S. MacColl, George Moore, R.A.M. Stevenson, Charles Whibley and Frederick Wedmore as fellow contributors to this movement. These writers, including Pennell, were instrumental in developing formalist art criticism, an important method adopted by some critics in the twentieth century.

=== Food criticism ===
Pennell's place in the literary history of cooking and eating has recently been reappraised, as she "paved the way for food writers such as Elizabeth David, M. F. K. Fisher, and Jane Grigson," according to Jacqueline Block Williams.

Pennell was a regular contributor to a column in the Pall Mall Gazette, entitled "The Wares of Autolycus". (The reference is to a character in Shakespeare's A Winter's Tale.) She commented that it was "daily written by women and I daresay believed by us to be the most entertaining array of unconsidered trifles that any Autolycus had ever offered to any eager world"; she compiled her culinary essays as The Feasts of Autolycus: the Diary of a Greedy Woman (1896). This compilation was reprinted in 2000 as The Delights of Delicate Eating, and Pennell appears as one of the "forgotten female aesthetes" that Shaeffer evaluates in her book of that title, one who "aimed to reconfigure meals as high art, employing the language of aestheticism to turn eating into an act of intellectual appreciation". Clarke holds that Pennell demonstrated a "continuity" between "her thoughts on other types of taste".

=== Cookbook collecting ===
To enable her to write these light but erudite columns, Pennell bought cookbooks to use as reference material. At one point she owned more than 1000 volumes, including a rare first edition of Hannah Glasse, which led to her becoming, in the view of culinary historian Cynthia D. Bertelsen, "one of the most well-known cookbook collectors in the world". Pennell compiled a bibliography of her culinary library, which appeared first in articles for The Atlantic and then in a book entitled My Cookery Books, focussing on C17 and C18 English writers. Much of this collection eventually went to the Rare Book and Special Collections Division at the Library of Congress, where curator Leonard N. Beck gave it a professional evaluation, pairing her collection with that of food chemist Katherine Bitting See the Elizabeth Robins Pennell Collection. The title, Two Loaf-Givers, refers to the Old English etymology of "lady"; a digital version is available.

=== Biographies ===
Following her success with Mary Wollstonecraft, Pennell wrote other biographies, producing in 1906 the first one of her uncle, Charles Leland, who had written, or compiled, Aradia, or the Gospel of the Witches (1899), a book very influential in the development of the Neopagan religion of Wicca. The Pennells were friends and correspondents of the painter James Abbott McNeill Whistler, and they wrote a lengthy biography of him in 1911. (Her fellow art critic Lady Colin Campbell, whose famous portrait by Giovanni Boldini Pennell had praised, was also close to Whistler.) Pennell also wrote a biography, after his death in 1928, of her husband.

=== Cycle tourism ===
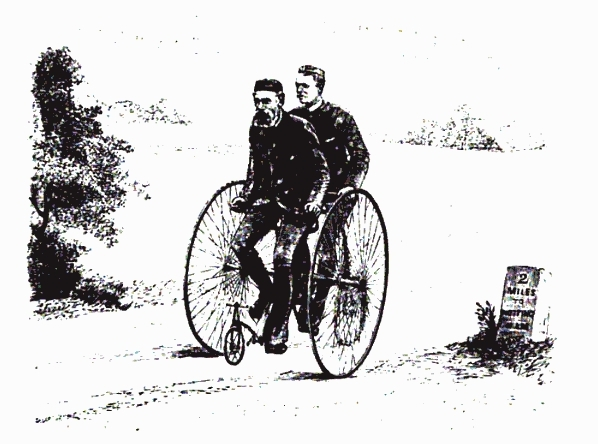
A Humber tandem tricycle, circa 1885

The final string to her bow was as a cyclist. She praised cycling in general, and the ease with which it enabled city dwellers to escape to the countryside, for its fresh air and views. She claimed that "there is no more healthful or more stimulating form of exercise; there is no physical pleasure greater than that of being borne along, at a good pace, over a hard, smooth road by your own exertions". She disparaged racing (for men but especially for women), preferring long unpressured travel, and wondering if she had inadvertently "broken the record as a touring wheel-woman".

She started off cycling in the 1870s, while she still lived in Philadelphia. On moving to London, she and her husband exchanged their Coventry Rotary tandem tricycle for a Humber model, going on to experiment with a single tricycle, a tandem bicycle, and finally a single bicycle with a step-through ("dropped") frame.

The first journey that they turned into a book was A Canterbury Pilgrimage, a homage to Chaucer's Canterbury Tales, as a gentle introduction to cycling in England. Over the next few years, the pair took several trips together, including another literary pilgrimage, this time on the trail of Laurence Sterne's 1765 travel novel A Sentimental Journey Through France and Italy. On a later leg of this 1885 journey they "wheeled" (rode) a tandem tricycle from Florence to Rome, attracting more attention than she was comfortable with, as possibly the first female rider that the Italians had ever seen. In 1886, now each on safety bicycles, they journeyed to Eastern Europe. This was at a key time in the history of the bicycle, and, of course, in the history of women's rights as well, and they were both intertwined, in the figure of the New Woman. Suffragists and social activists such as Susan B. Anthony and Frances Willard recognised the transformative power of the bicycle. By the time the Pennells had gone Over the Alps on a Bicycle (1898), Annie Londonderry had already become the first woman to bicycle around the world. There was a ready audience for Robins Pennell's books, and the last-mentioned was chosen as a book of the month.

== Later life ==
The Pennells moved back to the United States towards the end of World War I, settling in New York City. After her husband's death, she moved from Brooklyn to Manhattan, dying there in February 1936. Their books, especially her significant cookbook collection (reduced to 433) and a 300-strong collection on fine printing and bibliography, were bequeathed to the Library of Congress. Her papers and those of her husband are held by university archives.

Pennell often made her contributions under pen names such as "N.N." (No Name), "A.U." (Author Unknown) and "P.E.R." (her initials jumbled up).

== Publications ==
- Life of Mary Wollstonecraft (Roberts Brothers, 1884, part of the "Famous Women" series)
- A Canterbury Pilgrimage (Seeley & Co., 1885)
- An Italian Pilgrimage (Seeley & Co., 1887) with Joseph Pennell.
- Our Sentimental Journey through France and Italy (1888) with Joseph Pennell.
- Our Journey to the Hebrides (with Joseph Pennell) (1889)
- The Stream of Pleasure: a Narrative of a Journey on the Thames from Oxford to London (with Joseph Pennell) (1891)
- To Gipsyland (The Century Co., 1893)
- Tantallon Castle (1895) (see Tantallon Castle
- London's Underground Railways(1895)
- The Feasts of Autolycus: the Diary of a Greedy Woman (1896). A compilation of the culinary essays she first published in the Pall Mall Gazette. Re-issued 1901 as The Delights of Delicate Eating. (Also, A Guide for the Greedy, by a Greedy Woman: being a new and revised edition of "The Feasts of Autolycus".) Reprinted in 2000 with an introduction by Jacqueline Block Williams.
- Around London by Bicycle (1897)
- Over the Alps on a Bicycle (1898) with Joseph Pennell
- Lithography and Lithographers (1898) with Joseph Pennell (see also 1915)
- My Cookery Books (1903). From the Collections at the Library of Congress
- Charles Godfrey Leland: a Biography (Houghton, Mifflin & Co., 1906)
- French Cathedrals, Monasteries and Abbeys, and Sacred Sites of France (New York, The Century Co.) 1909
- Our House and the People in It (Houghton, Mifflin & Co., 1910) (Also Our House and London Out of Our Windows 1912.)
- The Life of James McNeill Whistler (J. B. Lippincott company, 1911) with Joseph Pennell.
- Our Philadelphia (1914) with Joseph Pennell.
- Lithography and Lithographers (1915) with Joseph Pennell 'Not merely a new edition. The book is new though based upon the old!--(Preface) (see also 1898).
- Nights: Rome & Venice in the Aesthetic Eighties, London & Paris in the Fighting Nineties (J. B. Lippincott Company, 1916)
- The Lovers (W. Heinemann, 1917)
- The Whistler Journal (J. B. Lippincott Company, 1921)
- Italy's Garden of Eden (1927)
- The Art of Whistler (1928)
- The Life and Letters of Joseph Pennell (1929)
- Whistler the Friend (1930)
- (anthologized in) American Food Writing: an Anthology with Classic Recipes, ed. Molly O'Neill (Library of America, 2007) ISBN 1-59853-005-4
