= Resler v. Shehee =

- Supreme Court of the United States

Argued December 9, 1801 Decided December 11, 1801
- Full case name: Jacob Resler v. James Shehee
- Citations: 5 U.S. 110 (more) 1 Cranch 110; 2 L. Ed. 51; 1801 U.S. LEXIS 119

Case history
- Prior: on Writ of Error to the Circuit Court of the District of Columbia

Holding
- An appeals court that hears an appeal that was filed late does so at its own discretion and need not do so in all cases.

Court membership
- Chief Justice John Marshall Associate Justices William Cushing · William Paterson; Samuel Chase · Bushrod Washington; Alfred Moore

Case opinion
- Majority: Cushing, joined by unanimous

Resler v. Shehee, 5 U.S. (1 Cranch) 110 (1801), was a United States Supreme Court case that involved judicial discretion on whether to hear appeals filed late.

== Background ==
Around the start of the 19th century, courts typically met in sessions. Appeals had to be filled in the current session or the next session after the original judgment. The courts in Virginia often heard appeals that were filed out of time. A Court of Hustings in Alexandria, Virginia heard a complaint on February 2, 1801. At that time, the laws of Virginia held that the appeal should be heard on April 6, 1801. Before the appeal could be heard, The United States Congress passed an act on February 29, 1801 creating the District of Columbia and its new Circuit Court. Two terms later, Resler appealed to the new Circuit Court and his appeal was denied on the grounds that it was late. He appealed to the Supreme Court on the grounds that the Virginia appellate courts would have heard the claim.

== Opinion of the Court ==
The decision of the court is sufficiently short as to merit its inclusion here in totality:

It is true that the courts of Virginia have been very liberal in admitting any plea at the next term after an office judgment which was necessary to bring forward the substantial merits of the case, whether it was strictly an issuable plea or not. But at a subsequent term it is matter of discretion with the court whether they will admit any plea at all.

Thus the appeal was dismissed.

== See also ==
- List of United States Supreme Court cases, volume 5
- Statute of Limitations
- History of Washington, D.C.
