= George Cochran Lambdin =

American painter

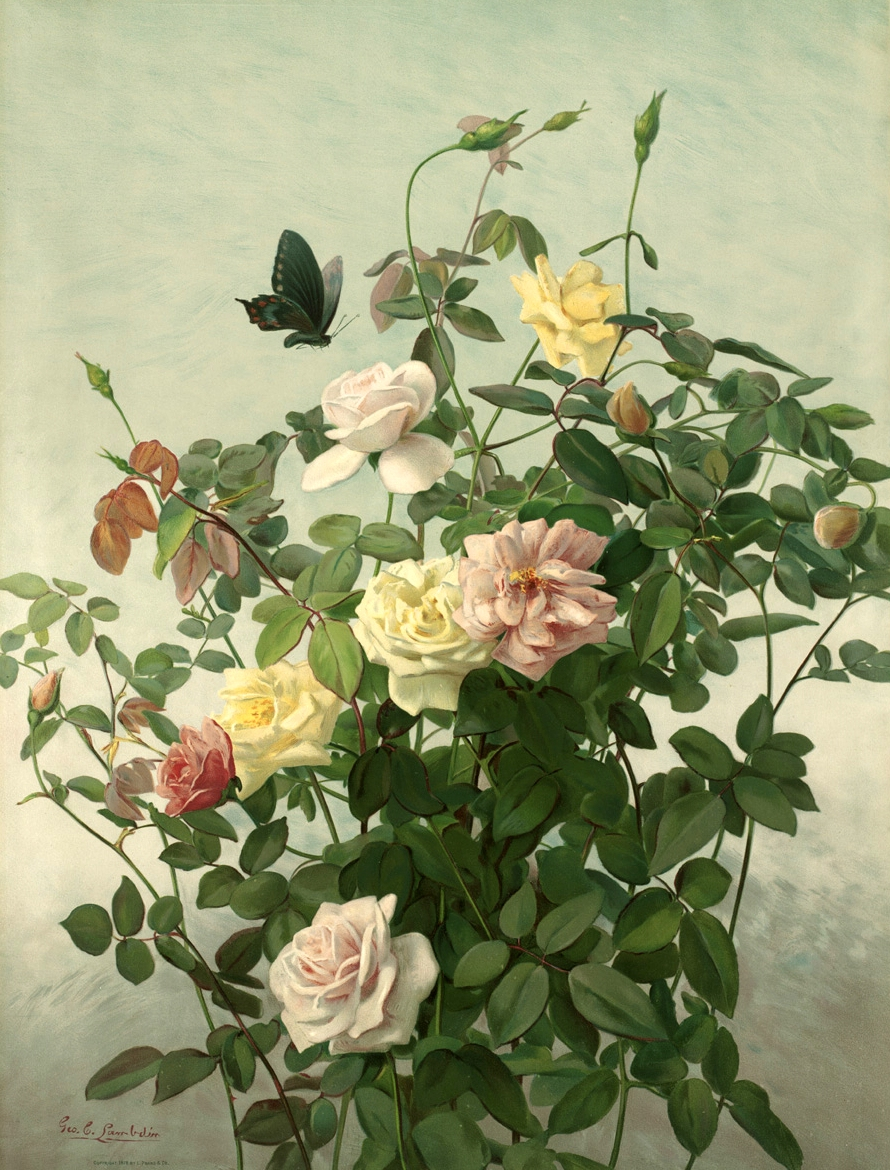
June Morning, an 1878 chromolithograph based on Lambdin's painting

George Cochran Lambdin (1830–1896) was an American Victorian artist, best known for his paintings of flowers.

== Early life and education ==
Lambdin was born January 6, 1830, in Pittsburgh, Pennsylvania, the son of portrait painter James Lambdin. He studied at the Pennsylvania Academy of the Fine Arts in Philadelphia, and exhibited there beginning in 1848.

== Career ==
During the American Civil War, he worked with the United States Sanitary Commission, distributing medicines and bandages to troops in the field. He painted genre scenes of camp life and domestic scenes that often included soldiers.

He was in poor health, beginning in middle age, and settled in the Germantown section of Philadelphia. There, he concentrated on painting flowers, especially roses, for the last 25 years of his life. Many of these paintings were copied as chromolithographs and were mass-produced.

In 1868, he was elected to the National Academy of Design as an academician of the Pennsylvania Academy of the Fine Arts. He died in Germantown on January 28, 1896.

== Gallery ==
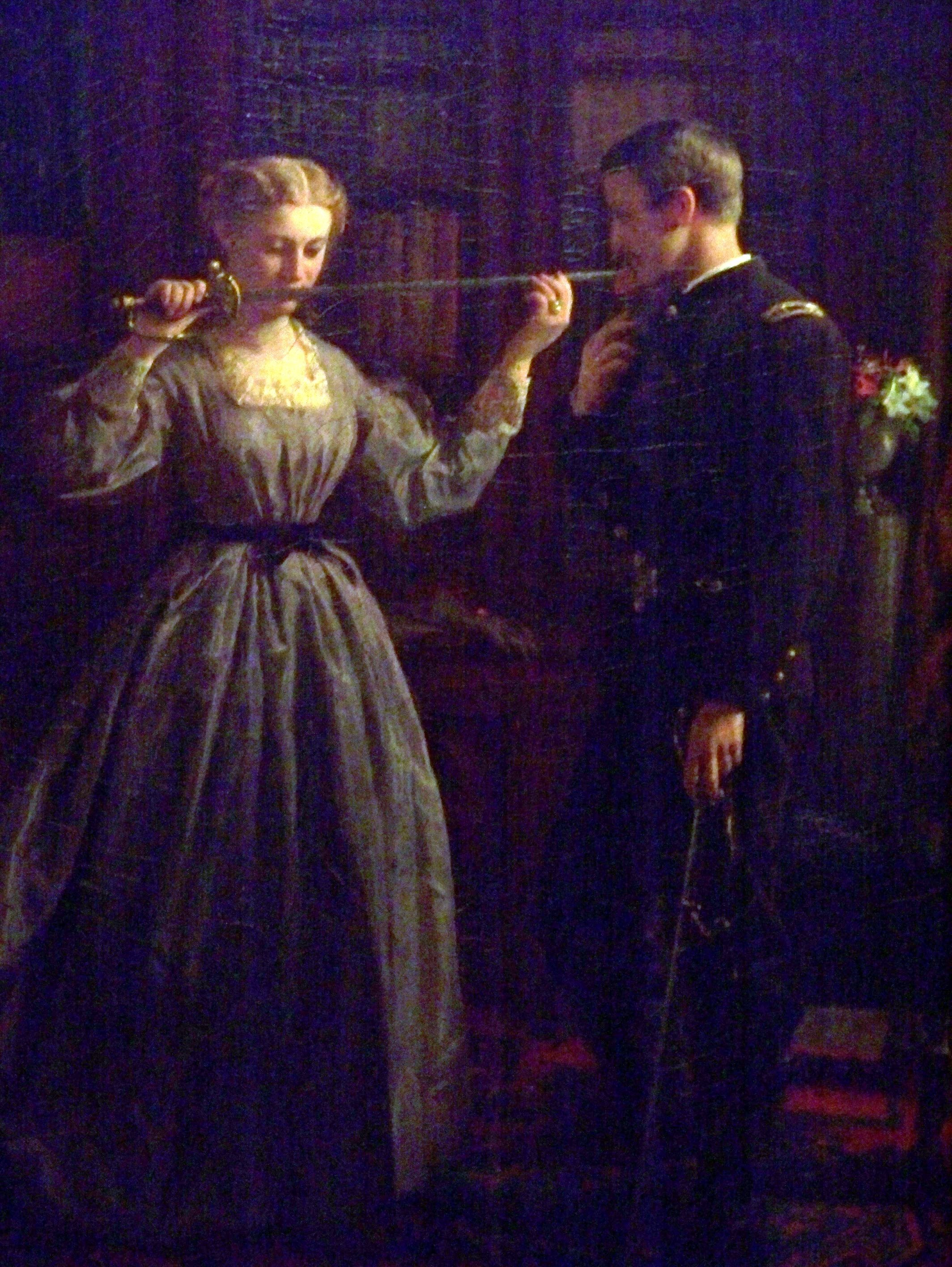
The Consecration (1865), on display at the Indianapolis Museum of Art in Indianapolis

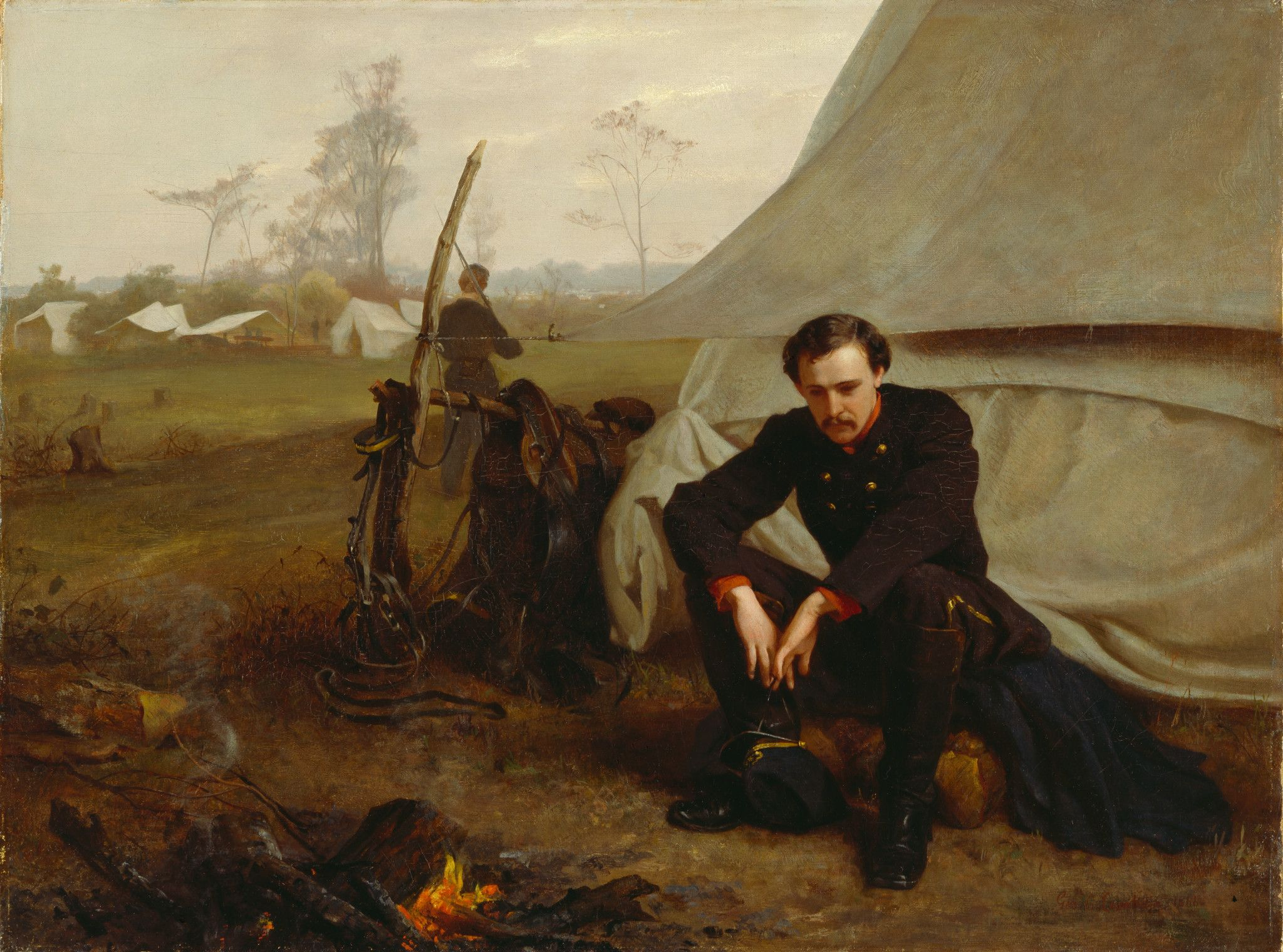
At the Front (1866), on display at the Detroit Institute of Arts in Detroit

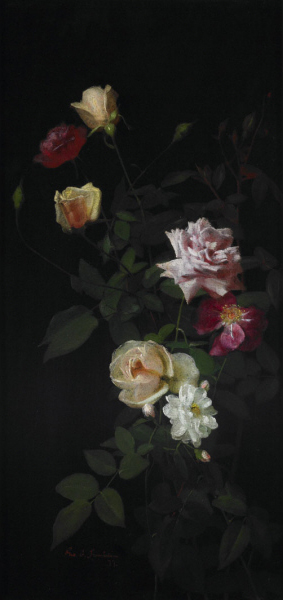
Still Life (1877), on display at the Saint Louis Art Museum in St. Louis
