= James Lambdin =

American painter (1807–1889)

James Reid Lambdin
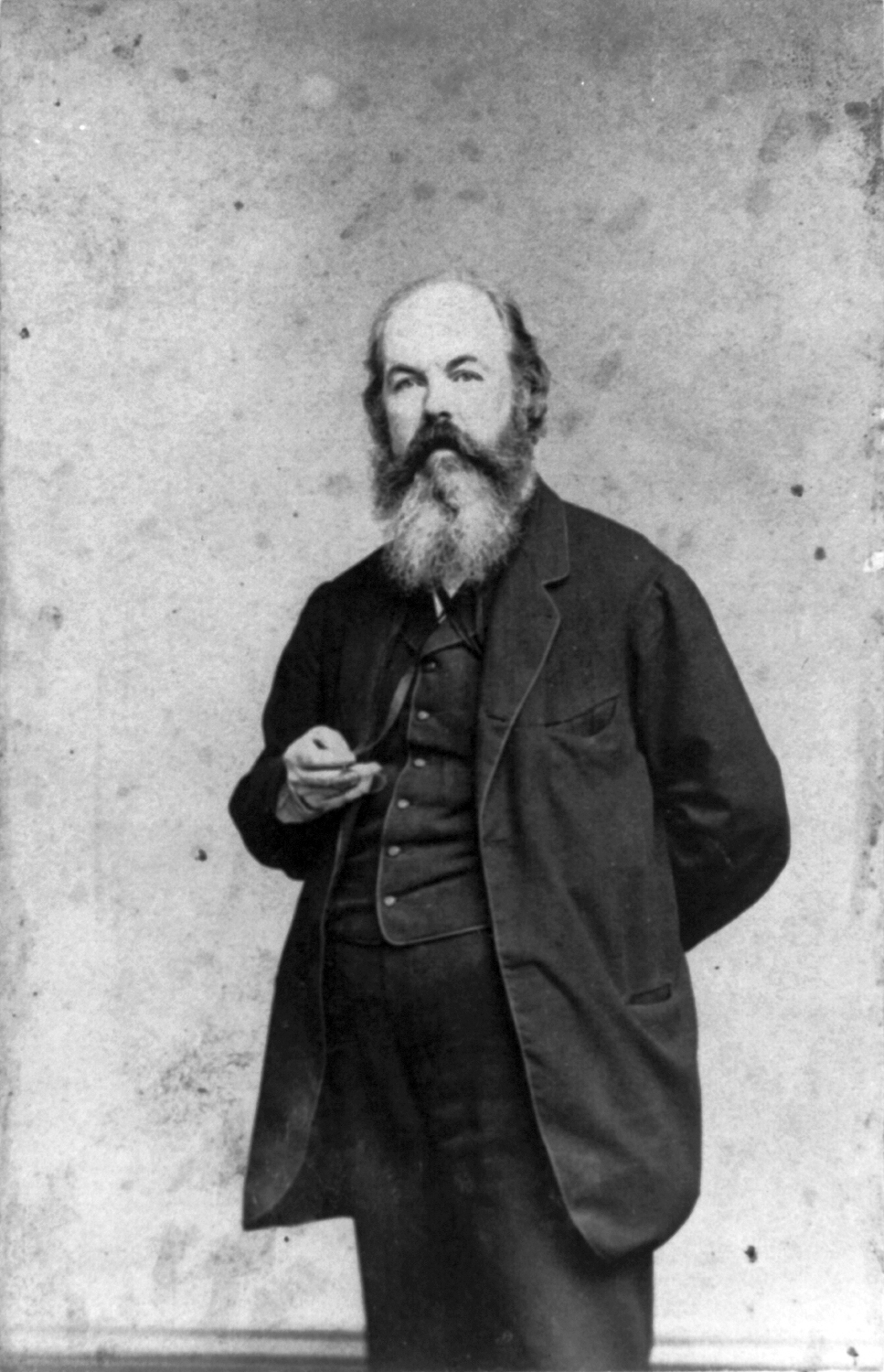
- Lambdin in 1862
- Born: James Reid Lambdin; May 10, 1807; Pittsburgh, Pennsylvania, U.S.
- Died: 1889 (aged 81–82)
- Known for: Artist
- Children: George Cochran Lambdin

James Reid Lambdin (May 10, 1807 – 1889) was an American born artist, famous for many of his portraits of U.S. Presidents.

== Early life and education ==
Lambdin was born on May 10, 1807, in Pittsburgh, Pennsylvania. He later studied art in Philadelphia for two years (1823–25) under the tutelage of Thomas Sully.

== Career ==
Lambdin painted portraits of U.S. Presidents, including William Henry Harrison and Zachary Taylor. He was professor of fine arts at the University of Pennsylvania in Philadelphia.

== Personal life ==
He had one son, George Cochran Lambdin, born in Pittsburgh in 1830, who also became an artist. In 1839, he was elected to the National Academy of Design as an honorary academician.

== Gallery ==
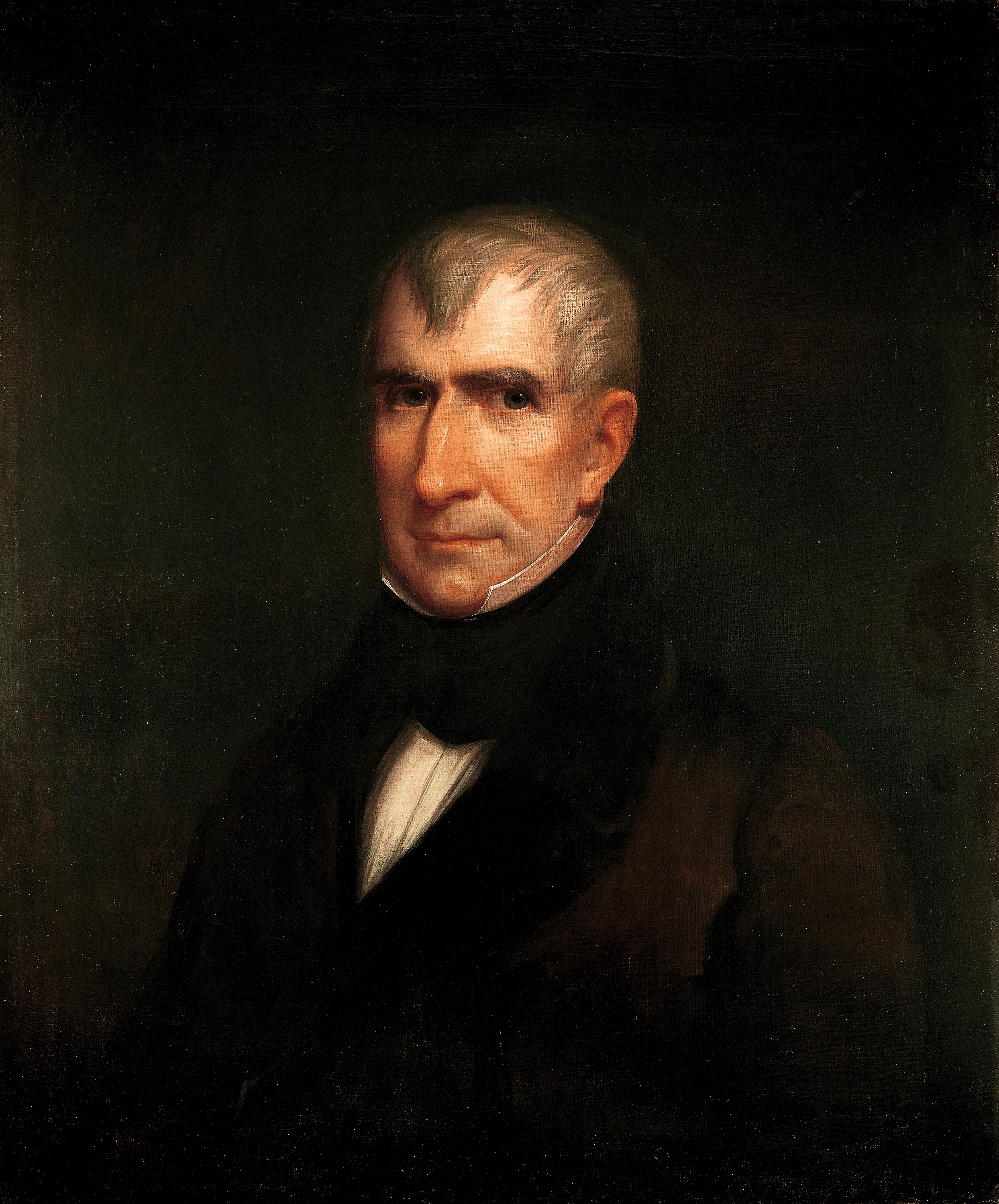
Portrait of President William Henry Harrison.

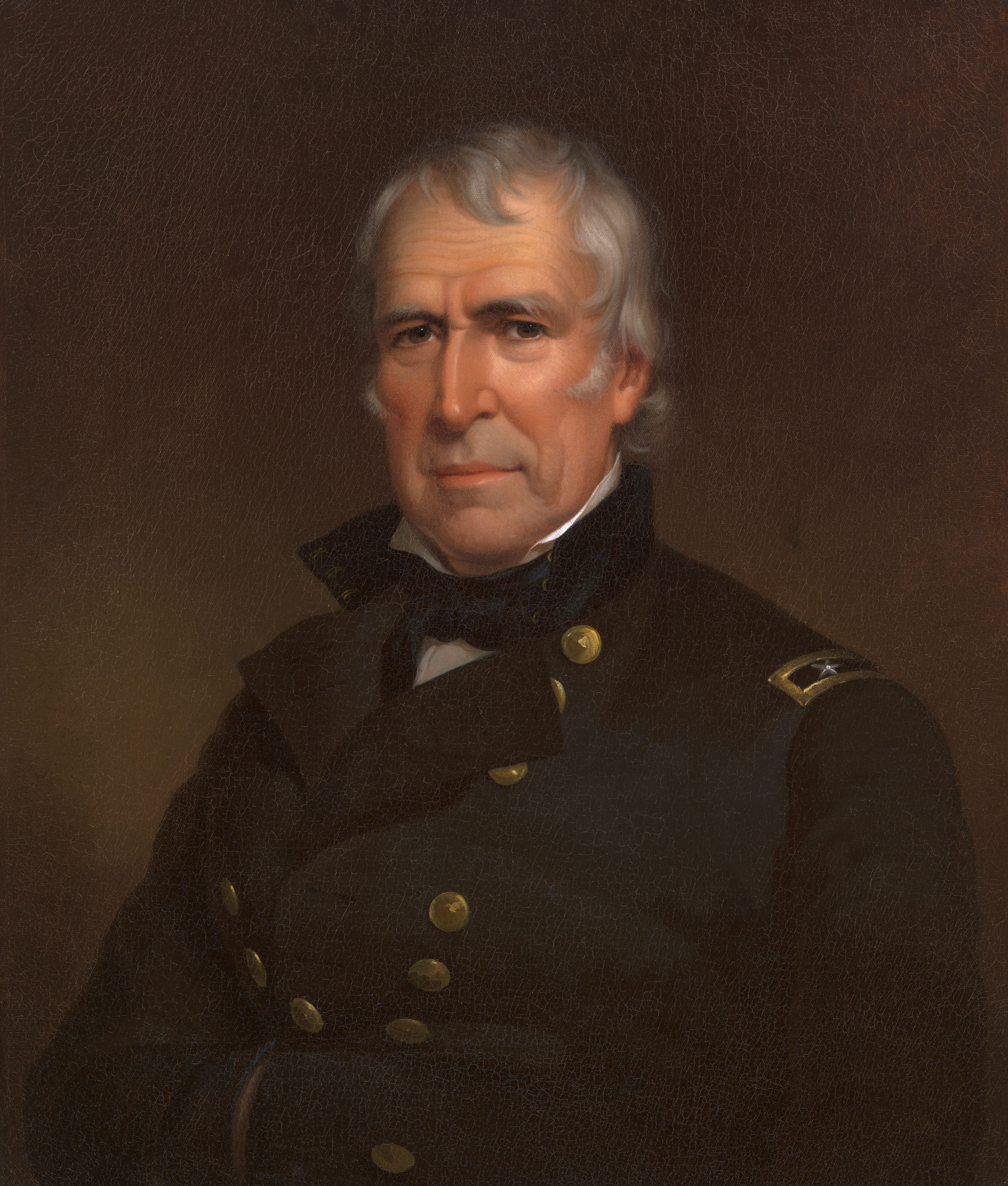
Portrait of President Zachary Taylor.

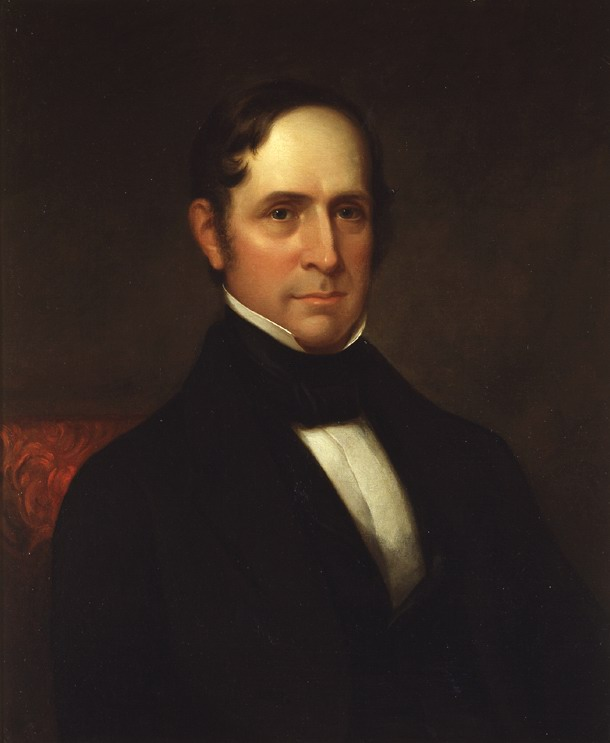
Portrait of Willie Person Mangum, United States Senator.

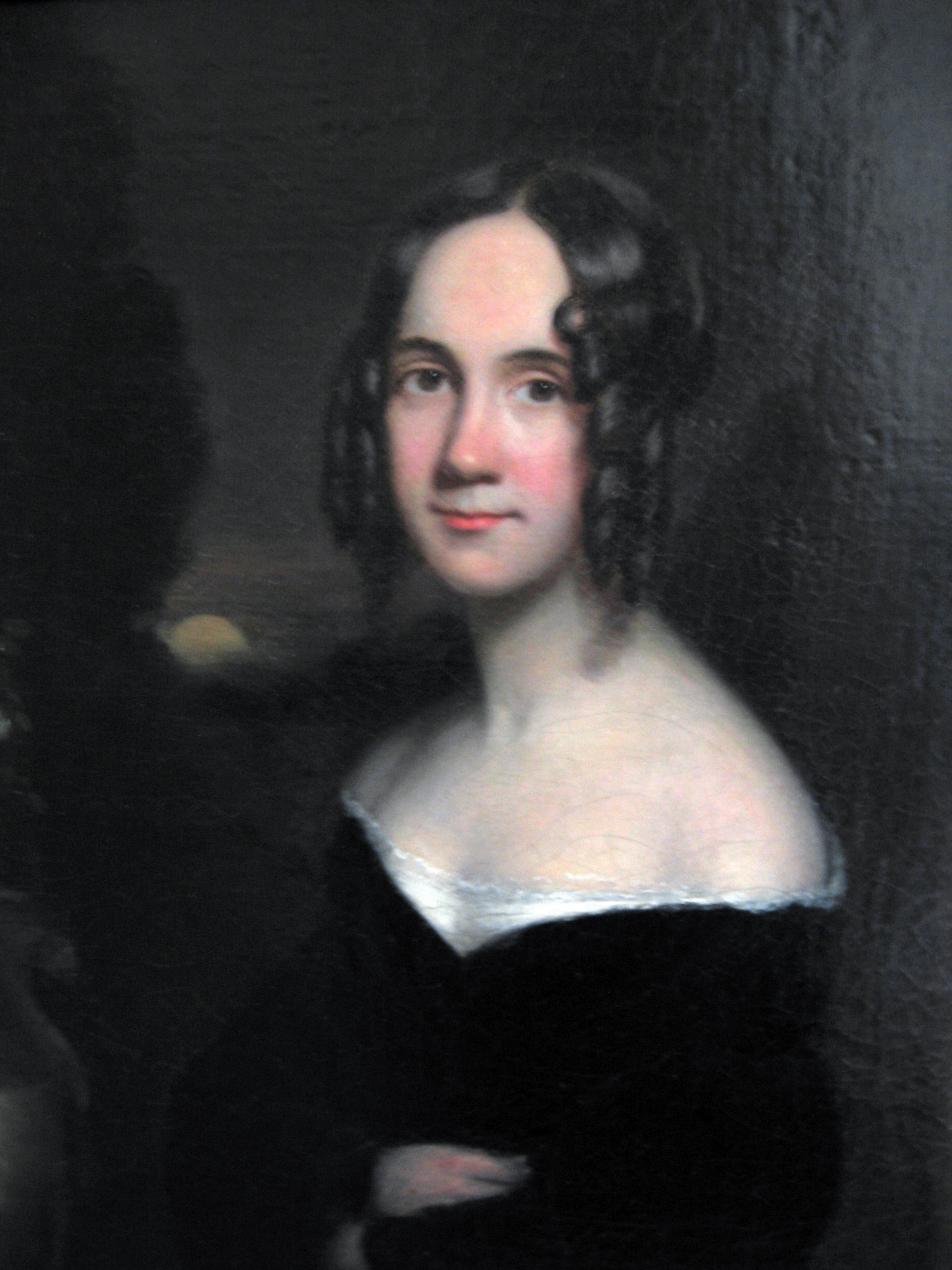
Portrait of Sarah Josepha Hale, editor of Godey's Lady's Book.

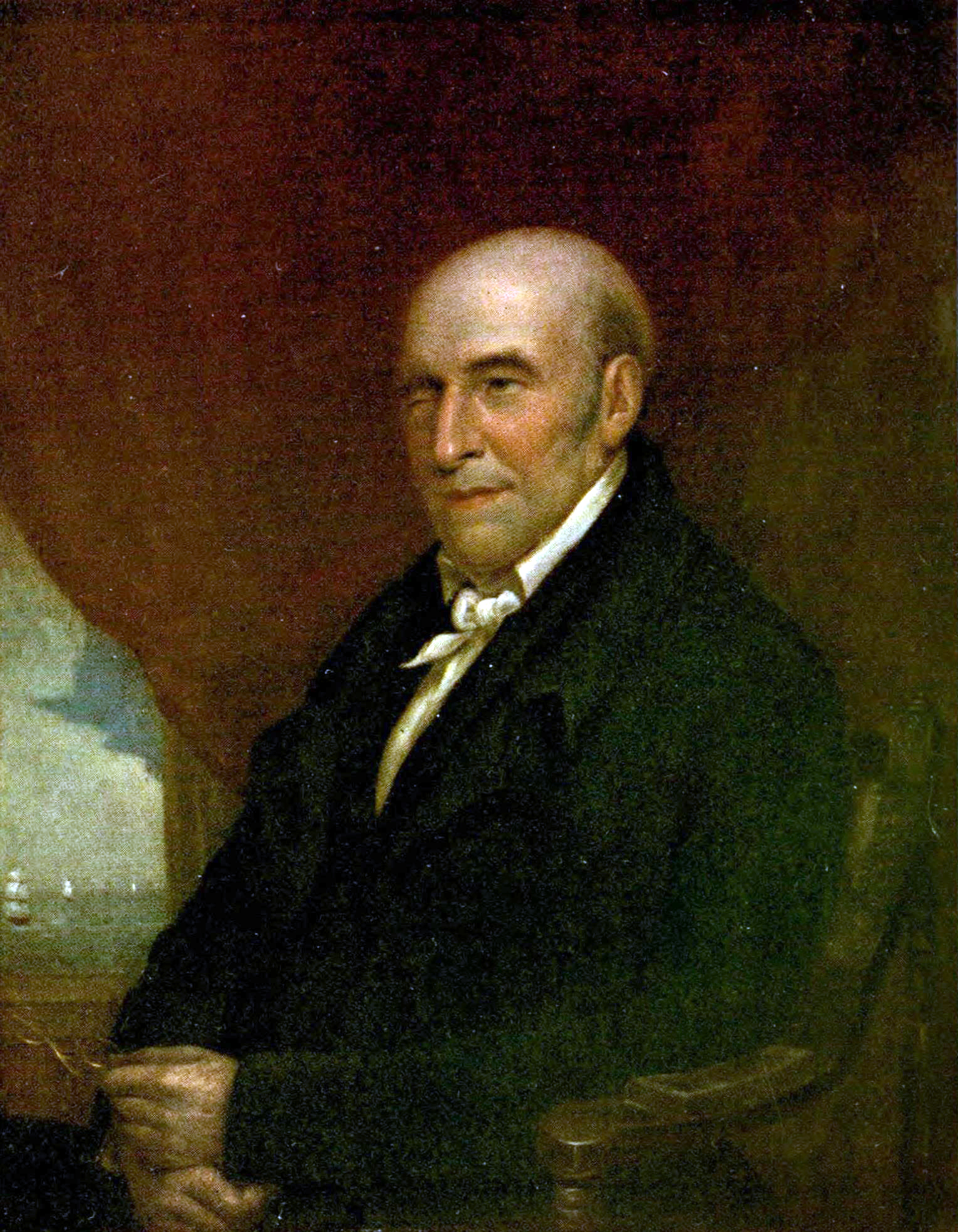
Portrait of Stephen Girard, based on an 1832 portrait by Bass Otis.
