= Criminal law in the Waite Court =

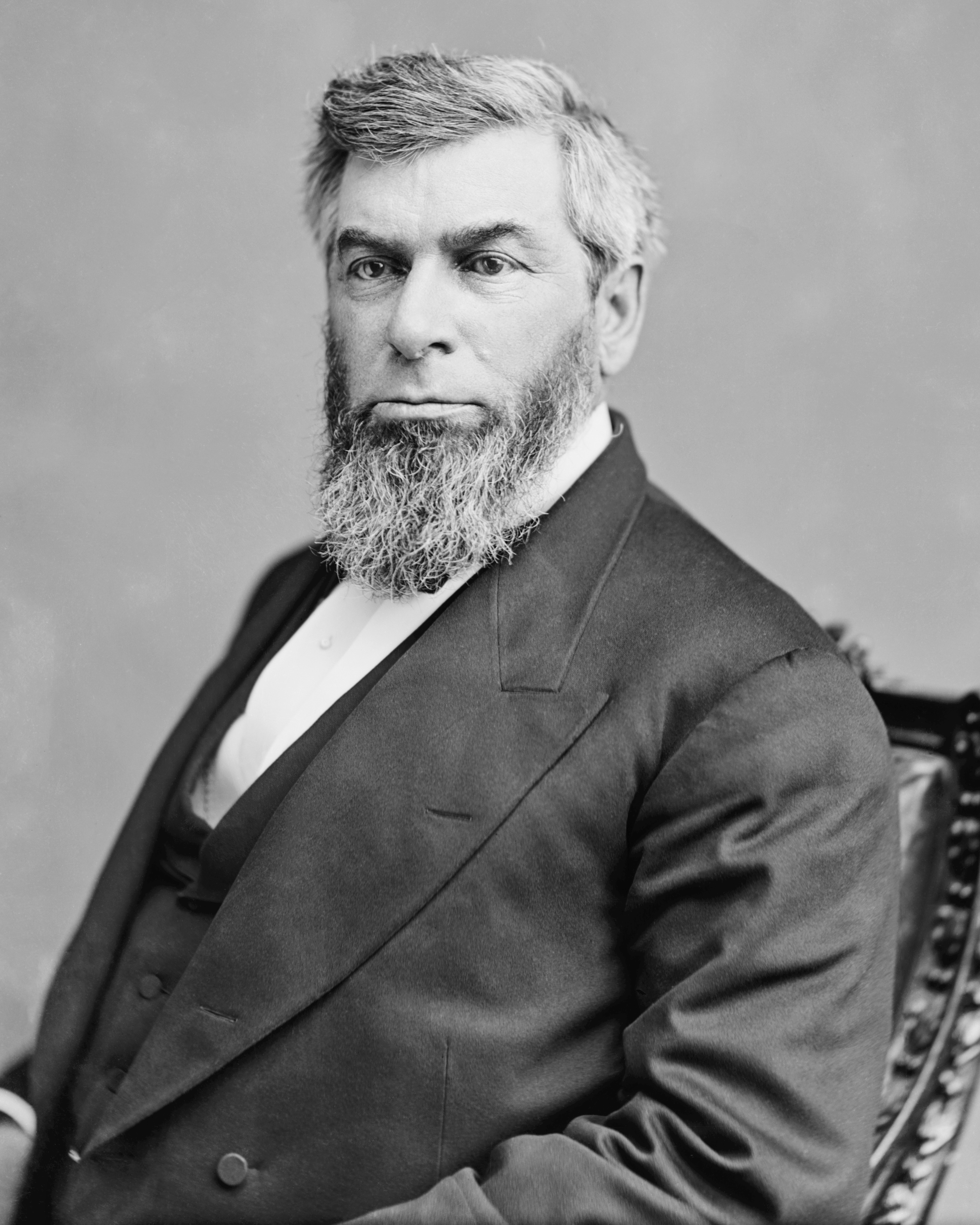
Chief Justice Morrison Waite

During the tenure of Morrison Waite as Chief Justice of the Supreme Court of the United States (March 4, 1874 through March 23, 1888), the Supreme Court heard an unprecedented volume and frequency of criminal cases. In just fourteen years, the Court heard 106 criminal cases, almost as many cases as the Supreme Court had heard in the period from its creation to the appointment of Waite as Chief Justice. Notable cases include United States v. Cruikshank (1875), United States v. Reese (1875), Reynolds v. United States (1878), Wilkerson v. Utah (1879), the Trade-Mark Cases (1879), Strauder v. West Virginia (1880), Pace v. Alabama (1883), United States v. Harris (1883), Ex parte Crow Dog (1883), Hurtado v. California (1884), Clawson v. United States (1885), Yick Wo v. Hopkins (1886), United States v. Kagama (1886), Ker v. Illinois (1886), and Mugler v. Kansas (1887).

The Waite Court decided many issues of first impression, both new crimes and new doctrines of criminal procedure and criminal investigations. For example, the Waite Court was the first to hear cases regarding the federal anti-polygamy statutes, the Reconstruction-era civil rights crimes, extortion under color of office, fraud on the United States, and mail fraud. Further, the Waite Court was the first to interpret the Confrontation Clause and the Grand Jury Clause, the criminal procedure implications of the Equal Protection Clause, and the application of the Fourth Amendment to criminal proceedings.

The Waite Court decided several issues involving the interaction between the federal courts and the courts of the various states, such as civil rights and federal officer removal, criminal jurisdiction in Indian country, and federal habeas review of state criminal convictions.

== Background ==
Despite the massive increase in the criminal case load before the Supreme Court, the statutory structure of the federal criminal system was not substantially changed during the Waite Court. In 1874 and 1878, the criminal statutes were codified in Title LXX of the Revised Statutes of the United States. Title LXX occupied only 41 pages.

== Sources of jurisdiction ==
=== Writs of error ===
==== State courts ====
The Waite Court heard twenty-five criminal writs of error from the state courts (as authorized by § 25 of the Judiciary Act of 1789 and its progeny). Several of these cases involved the compatibility of state criminal laws with the Dormant Commerce Clause (and its counterweight, the police power). In Welton v. Missouri (1875), the Court reversed a conviction for selling goods without a license. In Turner v. Maryland (1883), the Court upheld a statute that required inspection of exported tobacco packed at a different place from where it is grown. Barbier v. Connolly (1884) upheld a ban on laundries. Presser v. Illinois (1886) upheld a ban on militias. Walling v. Michigan (1886) invalidated a tax on out-of-state liquor wholesalers (which did not apply to in-state liquor wholesalers). Smith v. Alabama (1888) upheld a locomotive licensing scheme.

Others involved the Equal Protection Clause of the Fourteenth Amendment. Strauder v. West Virginia (1880) and Bush v. Kentucky (1883) reversed convictions because of racial exclusion in the jury system. In Pace v. Alabama (1883), the Court upheld an adultery prohibition that punished inter-racial fornication more than same-race fornication. Pace was overruled by McLaughlin v. Florida (1964). Yick Wo v. Hopkins (1886) struck down a discretionary laundry permitting system that disadvantaged Asians. Hayes v. Missouri (1887) rejected an equal protection challenge to a statute authorizing the prosecution more peremptory challenges in large cities.

Mugler v. Kansas (1887) upheld a state liquor prohibition under substantive due process.

The Waite Court was several times called upon to decide issues related to the interaction of the state and federal criminal systems. In Coleman v. Tennessee (1878), the Court held that a state court had no jurisdiction to try a Civil War-era murder by a soldier, which at the time was subject to courts martial jurisdiction (and where in fact the defendant had previously been tried and convicted). But, in Robb v. Connolly (1884), the Court permitted a state court to issue a writ of habeas corpus against the state officer who administers extradition to the state from other states. And, in Kurtz v. Moffitt (1885), the Court held that—as habeas is a civil proceeding and the federal diversity jurisdiction removal statute required an amount in controversy—state habeas proceedings could not be removed to federal court under this provision. Natal v. Louisiana (1887) declined to issue a writ of supersedeas, finding that the state's initiation of a civil suit while a writ of error was pending before the Supreme Court was not contemptuous.

Royall v. Virginia (1886) struck down a misdemeanor conviction for unauthorized practice under the Contract Clause. Royall's case repeatedly reached the Waite Court through various jurisdictional means, and ultimately Royall was denied relief.

==== Territorial courts ====
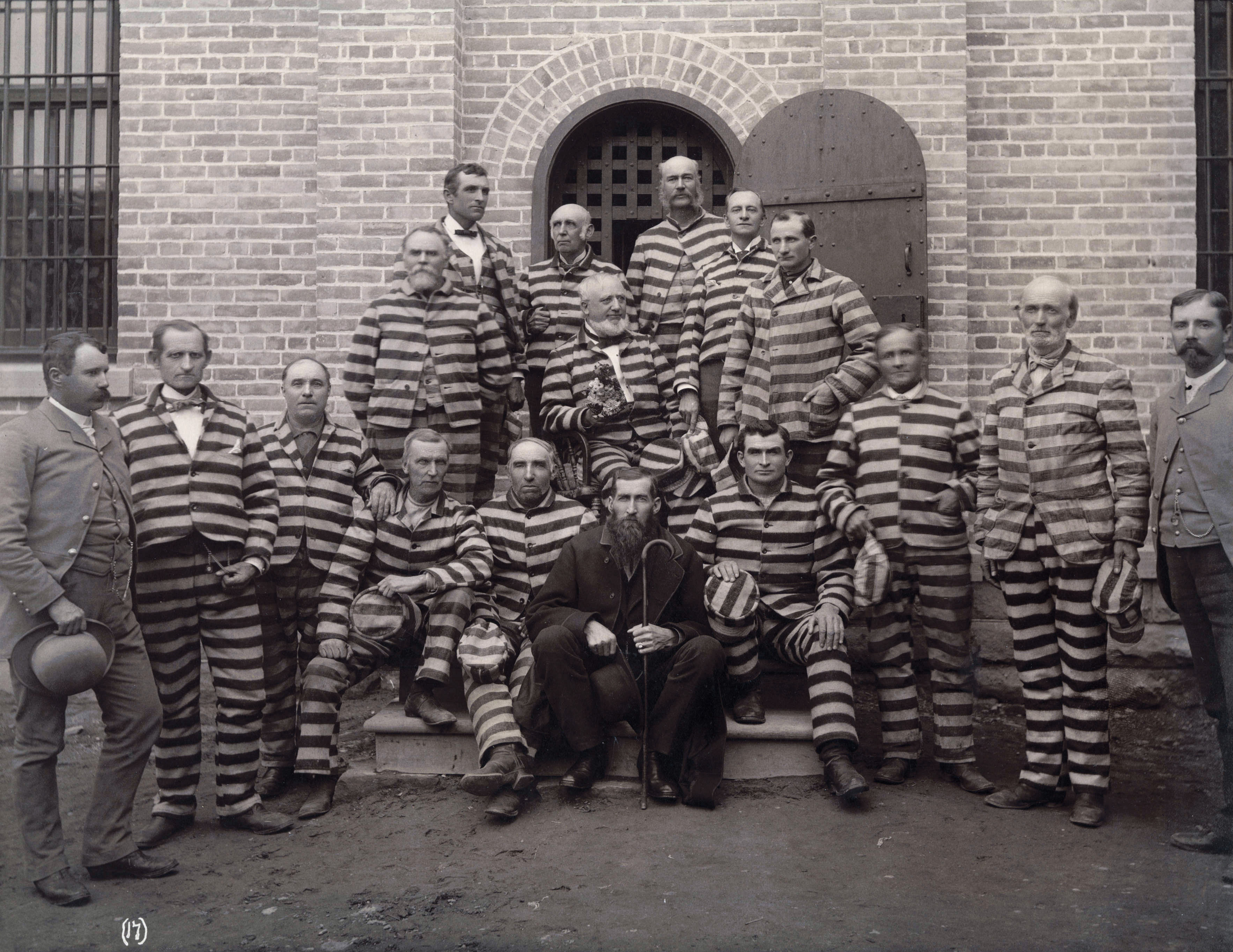
A group of imprisoned polygamists, including LDS Apostle George Q. Cannon

The Waite Court heard nine criminal appeals from the territorial courts, the majority of them arising from prosecutions of Mormon polygamists in the courts of the Utah Territory. Reynolds v. United States (1878) rejected six challenges to a polygamy conviction: that the territorial grand jury statute provided for fewer members that grand juries in the circuit courts; that it violated the Impartial Jury Clause to seat a juror opposed to polygamy; that for cause challenges were improperly granted to the prosecution; that testimony violated the Confrontation Clause; that polygamy was protected by the Free Exercise Clause; and that it was improper for the judge to comment on the social ills of polygamy.

Miles v. United States (1880) also rejected several challenges to a polygamy conviction. The Court held that bigamy could be proved by testimony (as opposed to, for example, a wedding certificate); that the question of whether the evidence established guilty beyond a reasonable doubt could not be raised de novo in the Supreme Court; that the judge could exclude jurors for-cause who believed polygamy was compelled by God; that it was too late post-conviction to complain for the first time that the wives were not named in the indictment; that there was no invalid variance from the indictment between the names "Caroline Owens" and "Caroline Owen Maile"; that wearing a wedding dress and attending a church known for polygamous weddings were competent evidence of marriage; that incompetent testimony (proof of the first marriage given by the second wife) could be given at the voir dire.

In another such case, Clawson v. United States (1885), the Court held that there was no right to bail on appeal where a defendant had been sentenced to imprisonment (there was such a right where the only punishment was a fine). Reaching the merits that same year, the Court held that the Congressional statute permitting for-cause challenges of jurors who believed that polygamy was divinely compelled applied to grand juries as well as petit juries, and that the marshall could call a second venire if the 200-person venire was exhausted before a full jury was seated.

In Cannon v. United States (1885), the Court rejected two further challenges. First, the Court held that an indictment for the polygamy offense (which only applied to male defendants) need not allege the gender of the defendant. Second, the Court held that it was no defense that the defendant had ceased having sexual relations with his additional wives.

An 1885 statute governing appeals from the territorial court reduced the possibility of such appeals. In Snow v. United States (1886), the Court rejected a polygamy appeal on the grounds that the statute granted jurisdiction in criminal appeals only if the validity, existence, or jurisdiction of the territorial courts was called into question. The statute did not preclude jurisdiction to hear appeals from denials of habeas corpus by the territorial courts. In Ex parte Snow (1887), the Court for the first time granted relief to a polygamy defendant, holding that the crime was a continuing offense, and thus the prosecutor could not increase the number of counts in the indictment by charging the same conduct over different time periods.

The Court also heard a few non-polygamy territorial appeals. In Smith v. United States (1876), the Court for the first time dismissed an appeal pursuant to the fugitive disentitlement doctrine. In Wilkerson v. Utah (1879), the Court held that execution by firing squad was not cruel and unusual punishment. In Ex parte Reggel (1885), the Court held that the territorial extradition statute—referring to "treason, felony, or other crime"—included misdemeanors.

=== Original habeas ===
Federal confinement The Waite Court heard twenty-four original habeas petitions in criminal matters. Many of these rulings held that the original habeas jurisdiction did not extend to the type of case presented. The general rule, articulated in several cases, was that there could be no post-conviction original habeas jurisdiction unless the court below was totally without jurisdiction (for example, if the criminal statute were unconstitutional).

Thus, in several cases, the Court found the alleged error too insubstantial to consider via original habeas. In Ex parte Parks (1876), the Court held that it had no original habeas jurisdiction to free a defendant convicted in a United States district court, even though no appeal was possible from the district court to the circuit court, and even though the petitioner alleged that the district court had been entirely without jurisdiction to try the offense charged. Similarly, in Ex parte Rowland (1881), the Court held that it had no original habeas jurisdiction to examine a contempt of court conviction arising from the disregard of a writ of mandamus. And, in Ex parte Bigelow (1885), the Court held that there could be no review of a double jeopardy determination of the Supreme Court of the District of Columbia. In Ex parte Harding (1887), the Court held that the composition of a grand jury (i.e. whether an alien sat) could not be so reviewed.

But, in several cases, the Court did find original habeas jurisdiction and reached the merits. In Ex parte Karstendick (1876), the Court held that a federal court had no statutory authority to sentence a defendant to hard labor at a state prison outside of its territorial jurisdiction. In Ex parte Jackson (1877), the Court considered several constitutional issues, including the Postal Power, the application of the First Amendment to mail-order gambling, and the application of the Fourth Amendment's warrant requirement to the mail. In Ex parte Lothrop (1886), the Court found that the Arizona territorial courts were properly constituted. In In re Sawyer (1888), the Court granted the writ to state judges imprisoned by a federal judge for violating an injunction.

In Ex parte Clarke (1879), the Court held that a habeas petition filed with a single justice would be referred to the entire Court.

State confinement

In Ex parte Royall (1886), for the first time, the Court was petitioned to grant an original writ of habeas corpus to a prisoner in state custody. The Court held that, assuming it had such a power, it should not be exercised except in special circumstances:

It is sufficient to say that if this court has power, under existing legislation, and upon habeas corpus, to discharge the petitioner, who is in custody under the process of a state court of original jurisdiction, for trial on an indictment charging him with an offense against the laws of that state,-upon which it is not necessary to express an opinion,-such power ought not, for the reasons given in the other cases just decided, to be exercised in advance of his trial.

In Ex parte Fonda (1886), the Court denied leave to file an original habeas petition, citing Royall. In Ex parte Ayers (1887), the Court denied a state-prisoner petition on the merits, finding that the state tax law did not violate the Contracts Clause.

=== Habeas appeals ===
During the Chase Court-era, Congress had stripped the Court of the authority to hear appeals from habeas petitions in the circuit courts. In Ex parte Royall (1884), the Waite Court dismissed such an appeal, holding that the jurisdiction had never been restored. But, the Court did retain jurisdiction over habeas appeals in a limited subset of cases. For example, in Wales v. Whitney (1885), the Court affirmed the Supreme Court of the District of Columbia's denial of a habeas petition on the merits, holding that it had no power to review a navy courts martial. Similarly, in Roberts v. Reilly (1885), the Court affirmed a denial of habeas corpus on the merits, but held that it had jurisdiction to consider such appeals under the Extradition Act.

In 1885, Congress restored the authority of the Supreme Court to hear appeals from habeas petitions in the circuit courts. In Ex parte Royall (1886), the first case heard under the new statute, the court affirmed a habeas denial, holding that the lower federal courts had discretion to grant or deny habeas relief while the petitioner had not exhausted potential state court remedies. In Mali v. Keeper of the Common Jail of Hudson County (1887), the Court denied another such appeal, holding that the consular treaty with Belgium had not deprived New Jersey of its power to punish a murder committed on a docked foreign vessel. But, in Baldwin v. Franks (1887), the Court granted the writ on appeal, holding that the Reconstruction-era civil rights crime statute applied only to those who deprived U.S. citizens (and not foreign nationals) of their rights.

=== Certificates of division ===
In Ex parte Tom Tong (1883), the Court held that—under 1872 amendments to the certification procedure, which went into effect during the Chase Court-era—because habeas corpus was a civil proceeding, questions arising in habeas cases could not be certified to the Supreme Court until a final judgment had been entered. In United States v. Hamilton (1883), the Court reaffirmed its earlier holdings that certificates could not issue from motions to quash an indictment.

=== Prerogative writs ===
The Waite Court heard two criminal cases under the prerogative writ of mandamus (habeas corpus is also a prerogative writ). In Virginia v. Rives (1879), the Court used mandamus to order a criminal cases removed to federal court under the civil rights removal statute to be remanded back to state court, finding that the statute did not authorize federal jurisdiction because the bar on African-Americans serving on juries was not codified by statute or state constitution. In Ex parte Wall (1883), the Court denied a writ of mandamus, finding that it was proper to remove an attorney who participated in a lynch mob from a case.

== Defining federal crimes ==
=== Bankruptcy fraud ===
In United States v. Fox (1877), the Court held that the criminal bankruptcy fraud statute exceeded Congress's powers under the Necessary and Proper Clause.

=== Civil rights ===
In United States v. Cruikshank (1875), the Court overturned a conviction under the civil rights crime statute, holding that the First and Second Amendment were not incorporated against the states and the Fourteenth Amendment only applied to state action. In United States v. Reese (1875), the Court overturned another civil rights conviction for depriving African-Americans of the right to vote, holding that the statute was void for vagueness as applied to voter suppression. In United States v. Harris (1883), known as the Ku Klux Case, the Court invalidated as unconstitutional the civil rights crime statute that applied to conspiracies to deprive state-law rights and privileges.

But, in United States v. Gale (1883), the Court upheld a statute that punished state officers for misconduct in federal Congressional elections. And, in United States v. Waddell (1884), the Court upheld a criminal civil rights law as applied to the rights of Homesteaders. In Ex parte Virginia (1880) and Ex parte Siebold (1879), the Court held that the civil rights crime statute was a valid exercise of Congress's power under the Thirteenth and Fourteenth Amendments. In The Ku Klux Cases (1884), the Court upheld a conviction for a conspiracy to prevent voters from voting for federal officials, finding a relevant constitutional right.

=== Counterfeiting ===
In United States v. Carll (1881), the Court defined the mens rea required under the counterfeiting statute. In Ex parte Carll (1883), the Court held that the offense of counterfeiting was stated where the name of the original payee had been erased and replaced.

In United States v. Arjona (1887), the Court upheld the constitutionality of a prohibition on counterfeiting the notes of foreign banks and corporations under the Foreign Commerce Clause and the law of nations power.

=== Embezzlement ===
In United States v. Britton (1883), the Court issued four opinions on the subject of the misapplication of public funds. In United States v. Smith (1888), the Court held that the clerk of the Collector of Customs was not a public officer and thus was not indictable for embezzlement.

=== Extortion under color of office ===
Section 12 of the Crimes Act of 1825 punished extortion under color of office:

Every officer of the United States who is guilty of extortion under color of his office shall be punished by a fine of not more than $500, or by imprisonment not more than one year, according to the aggravation of his offence.

In United States v. Germaine (1878), the Court held that § 12 applied only to defendants who were officers within the meaning of the Appointments Clause of Article Two of the United States Constitution. (Note: The Appointments Clause provides: "[The President] shall nominate, and by and with the Advice and Consent of the Senate, shall appoint Ambassadors, other public Ministers and Consuls, Judges of the supreme Court, and all other Officers of the United States, whose Appointments are not herein otherwise provided for, and which shall be established by Law: but the Congress may by Law vest the Appointment of such inferior Officers, as they think proper, in the President alone, in the Courts of Law, or in the Heads of Departments." U.S. Const. art. II, § 2, cl. 2 (emphasis added).) Because Germaine (a surgeon appointed by the Commissioner of Pensions) was not appointed by the President, a court of law, or a head of a department, the Court held that he was not covered by the statute. The key dispute was whether the Commissioner of Pensions was a head of a department. Germaine held that the phrase "Heads of Departments" in the Appointments Clause had the same referent as the phrase "principal Officer" in the Opinions Clause of Article Two. (Note: The Opinions Clause provides: "[The President] may require the Opinion, in writing, of the principal Officer in each of the executive Departments, upon any subject relating to the Duties of their respective Offices." U.S. Const. art. II, § 2, cl. 1 (emphasis added).) Further, the Court held the definition of "inferior Officer[]" turned on "tenure, duration, emolument, and duties [that] were continuing and permanent, not occasional or temporary."

=== Fraud on the United States ===
An 1873 statute punished fraud in connection with claims against the United States. In United States v. Hall (1878), the Court upheld the conviction of a ward who had withheld from a guardian the proceeds of such a claim. In United States v. Benecke (1878), the Court held that the statute did not apply to money withheld before its passage.

In United States v. Irvine (1878), a prosecution concerning a lawyer who withheld money from a client, the Court held that the crime was not a continuing offense was thus was susceptible to the statute of limitations. In United States v. Hirsch (1879), the Court held that the crime was subject to a 5-year statute of limitations, rather than the 3-year statute of limitations under the revenue laws.

=== Mail fraud ===
In Ex parte Henry (1887), the Court held that each mailing can form the basis for a separate count of mail fraud.

=== Perjury ===
In United States v. Curtis (1883), the Court held that a false oath taken before a notary public could not be the basis for a perjury conviction because a notary has no power to issue such an oath. But, in United States v. Ambrose (1883), the Court held that an accounting of services given to a clerk of court is a "certification" covered by the statute.

=== Private money ===
In United States v. Van Auken (1877), the Court held that the offense of circulating private legal tender did not apply to the circulation of a bill which stated that it was payable in goods only.

=== Revenue laws ===
In United States v. Norton (1875), the Court held that the embezzlement of postal money orders was not an offense under the revenue laws. In United States v. Spiegel (1886), the Court held that possession of an uncancelled stamp for imported liquors was not a crime unless it had been intentionally removed.

=== Trademark ===
In the Trade-Mark Cases (1879), a criminal prosecution under the new trademark law, the Court found the act unconstitutional under the Copyright Clause.

== Federal jurisdiction ==
Indian country

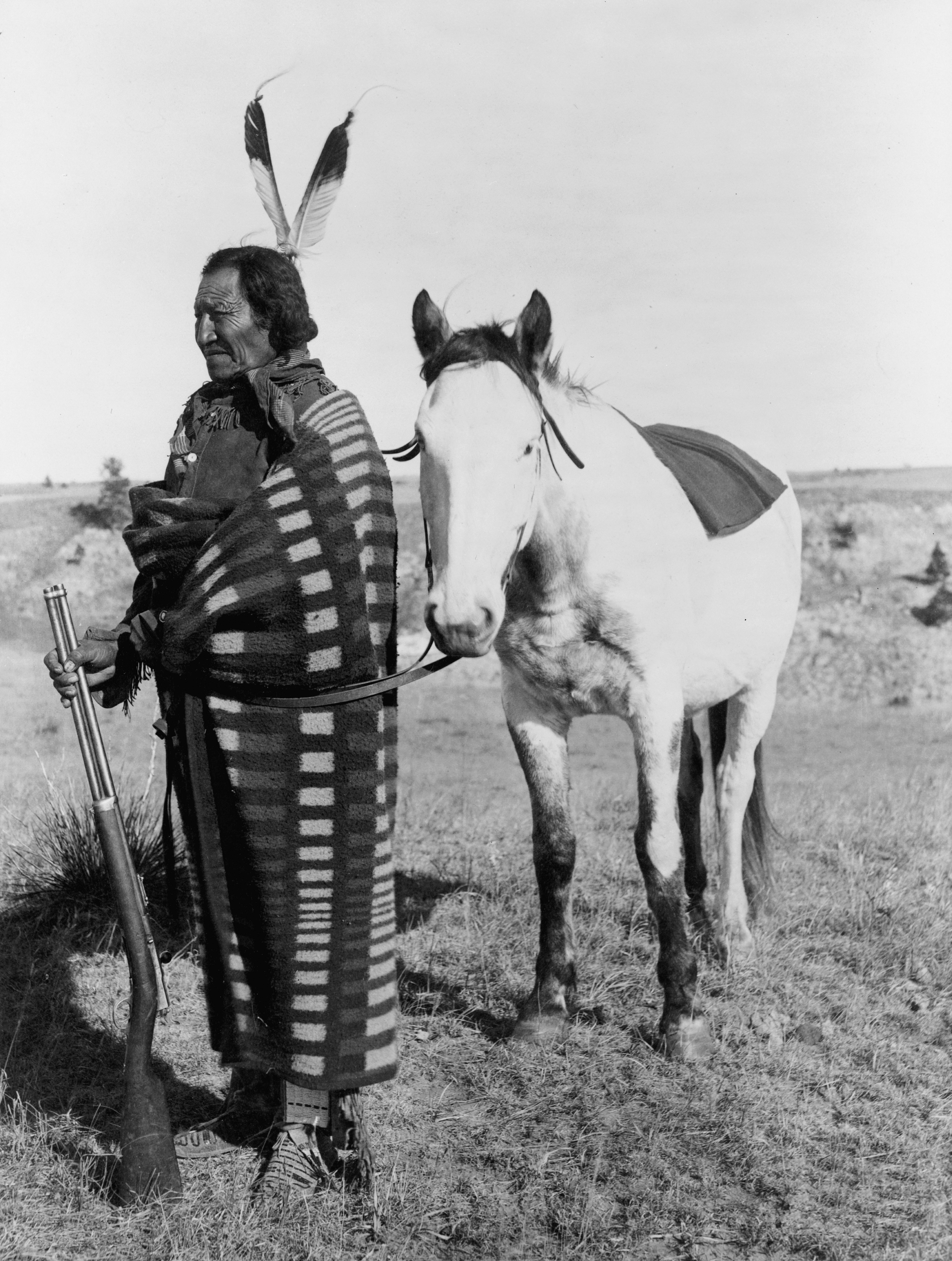
Crow Dog

In United States v. McBratney (1881), the Court held that the federal government had failed to reserve criminal jurisdiction over Indian country in Colorado upon its admission as a U.S. state. Thus, it had no jurisdiction to try the murder of a non-Indian by a non-Indian on the Ute reservation.

In Ex parte Crow Dog (1883), the Court held that the Nonintercourse Act of 1834's exception for Indian-on-Indian crimes had not been repealed by the "bad men" clause of a treaty, and that therefore there was no federal jurisdiction to try such a crime. Congress responded by passing the Major Crimes Act. In United States v. Kagama (1886), the Court upheld the Major Crimes Act.

Federal officer removal

In Tennessee v. Davis (1879), the Court upheld the federal officer removal component of the Reconstruction-era removal statute (the civil rights removal component of which had come before the Chase Court).

Davis v. South Carolina (1883) concerned an attempt by a state court to continue criminal proceedings in spite of an effected federal officer removal. On the merits, the Court held that an assistant U.S. Marshall was entitled to official immunity. Further, the Court held that bail could not be forfeited for failing to appear in state court after the removal.

Courts-martial

In Ex parte Reed (1879), the Court held that the clerk of the navy postmaster could permissible be tried by courts martial. In Ex parte Mason (1881), the Court held that courts martial jurisdiction extended to a military prison shooting and that the courts martial had the power to add a dishonorable discharge onto the maximum sentence authorized by Congress.

== Criminal procedure ==
=== Constitutional issues ===
Confrontation Clause

Reynolds v. United States (1878) was the first Supreme Court case where the defendant raised a Confrontation Clause issue. The Court held that the defendant's right to confront the witnesses (the alleged multiple wives) was forfeited by the wrongdoing of the defendant in procuring their absence.

Cruel and unusual punishment

In Wilkerson v. Utah (1879), the Court held that execution by firing squad was not cruel and unusual punishment.

Double Jeopardy Clause

In Kring v. Missouri (1883), the Court held that it violated double jeopardy for a statute to attempt to abrogate the rule that a guilty plea to second degree murder is an implied acquittal for first-degree murder. In Bohanan v. Nebraska (1886), without reaching the merits (but only deciding a motion to dismiss), the Court held that it had the authority to consider whether a second murder conviction in state court constituted double jeopardy.

Due process

In Brooks v. Missouri (1888), the Court held that a state rule requiring a new trial motion within four days of the verdict did not violate the Due Process Clause.

Equal protection and jury selection

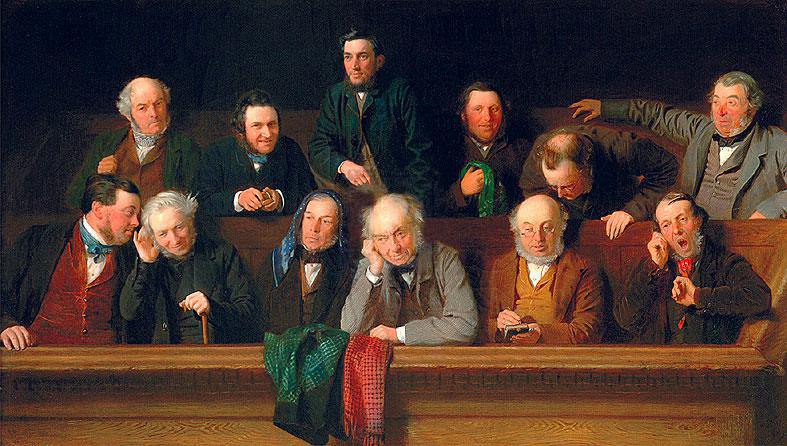
An all-white jury

Strauder v. West Virginia (1880) and Bush v. Kentucky (1883) reversed convictions because of racial exclusion in the jury system.

Hayes v. Missouri (1887) rejected an equal protection challenge to a statute that provided the prosecution 8 peremptory challenges in small towns and 15 in large cities.

Ex post facto law

In Kring v. Missouri (1883), the Court also found that the statute violated the Constitution's prohibition against ex post facto laws (the plea was entered before the state constitutional amendment was passed). This alternative holding was overruled by Collins v. Youngblood (1990).

Grand Jury Clause

In Ex parte Wilson (1885) and United States v. Petit (1885), the Court held that hard labor is an infamous punishment and therefore that the Grand Jury Clause of the Fifth Amendment attached. In Mackin v. United States (1886), the Court held that an authorized sentence of two years imprisonment (even without hard labor) was sufficiently infamous to require a grand jury. In Ex parte Bain (1887) and Parkinson v. United States (1887), the Court held that an authorized sentence of one year in the penitentiary was sufficiently infamous.

In Hurtado v. California (1884), the Court held that the Grand Jury Clause was not incorporated against the states by the Fourteenth Amendment. Hurtado remains good law, and—along with the Vicinage Clause of the Sixth Amendment and (maybe) the Excessive Bail Clause of the Eighth Amendment—the Grand Jury Clause remains the only criminal procedure provision of the Bill of Rights not to be incorporated.

=== Other ===
Sufficiency of an indictment

In United States v. Simmons (1877), the Court assessed the sufficiency of an indictment charging the production of untaxed alcohol. The Court held that an indictment must either name the defendant or state that the defendant's name is unknown.

In United States v. Hess (1888), the Court held that a mail fraud indictment was insufficient where it merely parroted the words of the statute. Rather, the Court required a more specific description of the scheme and the fraud.

Fugitive disentitlement

In Smith v. United States (1876) and Bonahan v. Nebraska (1887), the Court dismissed appeals pursuant to the fugitive disentitlement doctrine.

Objections to grand juries

In United States v. Gale (1883), the Court held that a challenge to the composition of a grand jury (specifically, the disqualification of Confederate veterans) was waived after the defendant entered a plea.

Corporate officer liability

In United States v. Northway (1887), the Court upheld the conviction of a bank president for a crime committed by his organization.

Costs

In United States ex rel. Phillips v. Gaines (1880), the Court held that it had no power to award costs in criminal cases.

Diplomatic immunity

In Ex parte Hitz (1884), the Court found that a Swiss consul indicted for embezzlement had no diplomatic immunity because he had resigned before the indictment.

== Criminal investigations ==
Fourth Amendment

Ex parte Jackson (1877) was perhaps the first criminal Fourth Amendment case to reach the Supreme Court. The Court held that a warrant was required to open mail. In Ex parte Spies (1887), the Court held that a Fourth Amendment claim was waived because the facts establishing the legality of the search did not appear in the record.

Foreign extradition

In United States v. Rauscher (1886), the Court vacated the conviction of a defendant who had been extradited from Great Britain to the United States, but not in conformity with the extradition treaty between the two countries. Justice Gray concurred, and Chief Justice Waite dissented. But, in Ker v. Illinois (1886), involving a defendant apprehended in Peru—a country which also had such a treaty but which had recently experienced a coup that interfered with the extradition process—the Court held that a defendant could raise no objection to the legality of his capture.
