= United States v. Antelope =

- Supreme Court of the United States

Argued January 18, 1977 Decided April 19, 1977
- Full case name: United States v. Antelope, et al.
- Docket no.: 75-661
- Citations: 430 U.S. 641 (more) 97 S. Ct. 1395; 51 L. Ed. 2d 701
- Argument: Oral argument
- Opinion announcement: Opinion announcement

Case history
- Prior: 523 F.2d 400 (9th Cir. 1975)

Holding
- The convicted Indians were not deprived of the equal protection of the laws; (a) the federal criminal statutes are not based on impermissible racial classifications but on political membership in an Indian tribe or nation; and (b) the challenged statutes do not violate equal protection. Indians or non-Indians can be charged with first-degree murder committed in a federal enclave.

Court membership
- Chief Justice Warren E. Burger Associate Justices William J. Brennan Jr. · Potter Stewart; Byron White · Thurgood Marshall; Harry Blackmun · Lewis F. Powell Jr. William Rehnquist · John P. Stevens

Case opinion
- Majority: Burger, joined by unanimous

Laws applied
- U.S. Const. amend. V, 18 U.S.C. § 1111, 18 U.S.C. § 1153

United States v. Antelope, 430 U.S. 641 (1977), was a United States Supreme Court case in which the Court held that American Indians convicted on reservation land were not deprived of the equal protection of the laws; (a) the federal criminal statutes are not based on impermissible racial classifications but on political membership in an Indian tribe or nation; and (b) the challenged statutes do not violate equal protection. Indians or non-Indians can be charged with first-degree murder committed in a federal enclave.

== Background ==
=== History of the Major Crime Act ===
In 1881, a Brulé-Lakota leader named Crow Dog shot and killed another Lakota leader, Spotted Tail on the Great Sioux Reservation in South Dakota. In accordance with Lakota law and customs, the tribal council ordered an end to the hostilities and Crow Dog paid restitution to Spotted Tail's family in cash, a blanket, and eight horses. After apparent outrage from the white communities in the area, Crow Dog was tried in a federal district court and sentenced to hang.

Crow Dog appealed his conviction to the U.S. Supreme Court, and in Ex parte Crow Dog the Court overturned the conviction, stating that it was not against federal law for one Indian to kill another Indian on reservation territory. Two years later, in 1885, Congress passed the Major Crimes Act, making Indian on Indian crime a federal offense.

=== Antelope's crime ===
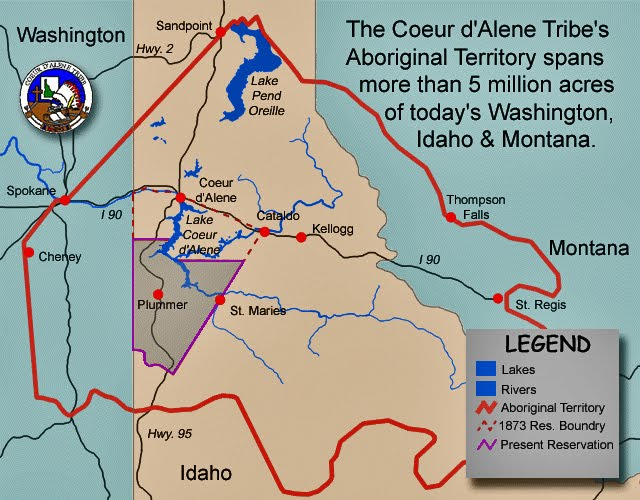
Map showing location of Coeur d'Alene reservation

In February 1974, Gabriel Francis Antelope, Leonard Francis Davison, William Andrew Davison, and Norbert Hillary Seyler broke into the home of 81-year-old Emma Teresa Johnson, burglarized the home and beat Johnson to death with their hands and feet. (Note: Antelope was 25, Leonard Davison was 17, and William Davison was 14 at the time of the murder.) All four were members of the Coeur d'Alene tribe and Johnson was a non-Indian living within the boundaries of the Coeur d'Alene Reservation.

=== Trial in federal court ===
Under the Major Crimes Act, the crimes committed by the four Indians were prosecuted by the United States Attorney instead of by the Kootenai County Prosecutor for the State of Idaho. During the trial in May 1974, Antelope and L. Davison were charged with felony murder, burglary, and robbery, while W. Davison was only charged with second degree murder. After being convicted on May 31, 1974, Antelope and L. Davison were later sentenced to life in prison for felony murder and to two 15 year sentences (consecutive) for the other charges. (Note: Seyler, who was 15 at the time of the offense, was granted immunity for testifying against the other defendants.) W. Davison was sentenced to 12 years in prison for second degree murder.

=== Circuit court ===
All three Indians then appealed the case to the Ninth Circuit Court of Appeals. Antelope argued that the federal statute did not require proof of premeditation while the state statute did require such proof for a murder conviction, and that the statute discriminated against Indians due to their race. They contended that the federal statutes allowed the government to prosecute an Indian for killing a non-Indian on the reservation using a lesser standard for the offense, while a non-Indian who killed a non-Indian would be prosecuted by Idaho using a higher standard for the offense. The Ninth Circuit agreed, noting that there were four ways that a murder on the reservation could be tried and the three where one or more of the parties were Indian resulted in harsher punishment than had non-Indians only been involved. The court then reversed the murder convictions, ordering that they be tried under Idaho law.

== Opinion of the Court ==
Chief Justice Warren Burger delivered the opinion of a unanimous Court. Burger stated that "Federal regulation of Indian tribes, therefore, is governance of once-sovereign political communities; it is not to be viewed as legislation of a “ ‘racial’ group consisting of ‘Indians' . . . .”" The Court did note that some lower courts had found Indian status without finding enrollment in a tribe being necessary, but did not address it since it was not applicable to the parties in this case. (Note: The dicta was in a footnote.) Since the federal law was not racially motivated, it was not unconstitutional and the case was reversed and remanded.

== Subsequent developments ==
=== Court decisions ===
Antelope has raised additional questions. In the Eighth Circuit Court, Antelope has been used to support a finding that Indian blood quantum could be determinative of Indian status, not tribal membership or enrollment. On the other hand, the Ninth Circuit has held that the law "intentionally requires more than a simple blood test to determine whether someone is legally deemed an Indian." There, the Ninth Circuit required that the purported Indian actually be enrolled as a member of a tribe.

In United States v. Prentiss, the government alleged that the victim of an arson was an Indian, but did not offer any proof that the victim had "Indian blood" or that the defendant lacked Indian blood. The Tenth Circuit Court rejected that position, holding that the current tests required some showing of Indian blood.

=== Scholarly debate ===
==== Disparate treatment condemned ====
The decision allows American Indians to be punished more harshly than a non-Indian who commits the same crime. Scholars have pointed out that the decision of the Supreme Court in Antelope and a predecessor case, Morton v. Mancari have "has led to disparate treatment of Indian defendants in multiple criminal contexts." Others, such as former United States Attorney Troy Eid (Note: Eid is also the chair of the Indian Law and Order Commission, charged with conducting a comprehensive study of law enforcement and criminal justice in tribal communities.) have said that "Native Americans living and working on Indian reservations must endure a separate but unequal justice system that discriminates perniciously against them solely based on race and ethnicity." Some legal scholars opine that the Court's decision is wrong, noting that the first prong of a test for tribal membership is the race of the individual (Note: Noting that a white person legally adopted into a tribe did not receive the protection of tribal membership in United States v. Rogers) and that only after the racial prong is met does the political prong apply. (Note: The racial prong of the Rogers test is: The purpose of the first prong, requiring defendants to have Indian blood, is to "exclude[] individuals . . . who may have developed social and practical connections to an Indian tribe, but cannot claim any ancestral connection to a formerly-sovereign community. . . .") It has been noted that if Indian were considered a race-based designation instead of a political designation, it would be unconstitutional. (Note: Meisner notes that a member of a terminated tribe is not considered to be an Indian, while a person of mixed blood who is enrolled in a tribe is an Indian.)

==== Race-based treatment ====
Later cases, such as Adoptive Couple v. Baby Girl, have apparently based the Court's decision on race instead of political alignment. Justice Sonia Sotomayor noted this in her dissent, that "It is difficult to make sense of this suggestion [that a contrary result would create equal protection problems] in light of our precedents, which squarely hold that classifications based on Indian tribal membership are not impermissible racial classifications." Another article questions whether Antelope and Rogers would survive a case where a tribe enrolled a non-Indian as a member of that tribe, believing that such a challenge would result in the end of the "some Indian blood" requirement.

==== Plenary power over Indians ====
Other scholars point to a series of cases, including Antelope, indicating that Congress has plenary power to regulate the Indians tribes as it sees fit.

== See also ==
- United States v. Kagama
