= Certificate of division =

US judicial document; source of appellate jurisdiction

The certificate of division procedure originated during the tenure of Chief Justice John Marshall.

A certificate of division was a source of appellate jurisdiction from the circuit courts to the Supreme Court of the United States from 1802 to 1911. Created by the Judiciary Act of 1802, the certification procedure was available only where the circuit court sat with a full panel of two: both the resident district judge and the circuit-riding Supreme Court justice. As Chief Justice John Marshall wrote, he did not have "the privilege of dividing the court when alone."

The certificate of division procedure had unique features. Unlike writ of error and certiorari jurisdiction, the certificate of division procedure did not require a federal question. In criminal cases, the certificate of division was the only source of appellate jurisdiction from the circuit courts (save original habeas) until 1889. In civil cases, although ordinary writs of error were authorized, the certificate of division remained important because it permitted appeals without regard to the amount in controversy and interlocutory appeals. Inasmuch as the certificate of division permitted the Supreme Court some measure of control over its docket, it is a precursor to modern certiorari jurisdiction.

With regard to criminal cases, the Supreme Court held (in 1896) that Judiciary Act of 1891 operated as an implied repeal of the authorization to hear cases on certificates of division. But, the Court retained its authority to hear civil cases via certificates of division until the abolition of the circuit courts by the Judicial Code of 1911. A different, and rarely used, certified question procedure was adopted in 1925 and is currently codified at 28 U.S.C. § 1254(2).

== Background ==
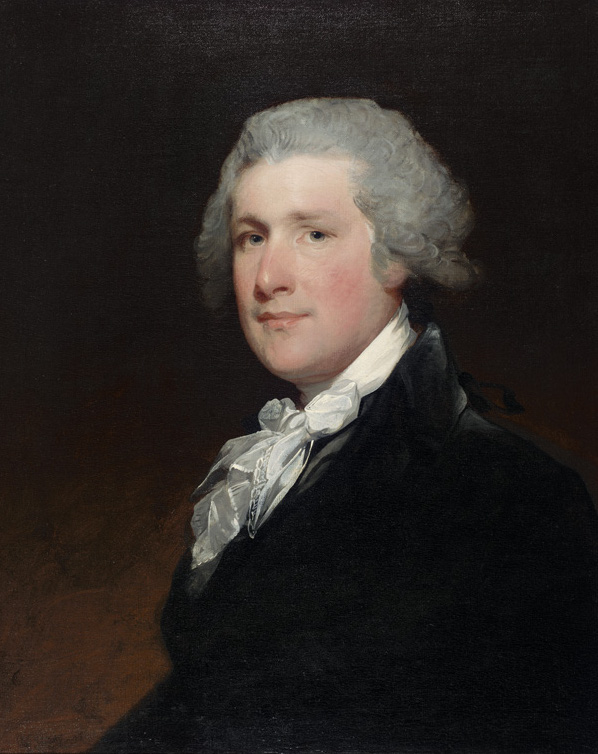
Alexander Dallas discussed the unavailability of a certificate of division procedure in a 1798 case where he acted as both counsel and reporter.

=== Circuit courts ===
Under the Judiciary Act of 1789, the circuit courts were composed of a stationary district court judge and any two Supreme Court justices riding circuit. The practice of circuit riding was briefly abolished by the soon-repealed Midnight Judges Act of 1801, and then restored by the Judiciary Act of 1802. Under the 1802 Act, the circuit courts were composed of a stationary district judge and one Supreme Court justice assigned to the circuit. (Note: The justices were to divide the circuits among themselves by agreement; failing that, the President was to assign the justices to circuits. Judiciary Act of 1802, § 5, 2 Stat. 156, 158.)

Section 4 of the Judiciary Act of 1789 had provided that two judges or justices would constitute a quorum. The practice of sending a single circuit rider was explicitly authorized by the Judiciary Act of 1793, but was already common before 1793. Under the Judicial Act of 1802, a single judge (either the district judge or the circuit rider) could preside alone.

=== Early tie-breaking methods ===
In United States v. Daniel (1821), Chief Justice John Marshall recounted the history of tie-breaking methods on the circuit courts. If one judge or justice disagreed with the other two, the majority prevailed. If only one Supreme Court justice could attend, and a division arose between the district judge and the Supreme Court justice, the practice—as required by the Judiciary Act of 1793—was to hold the case over until the next term. If a one-to-one division persisted with a different circuit riding justice, the opinion of the previous circuit rider broke the tie. After 1802, in cases where both judges sat, though, one-to-one divisions were less likely to be resolved by continuing the case until the next term because the circuit-riding justice would be the same (barring a change in membership on the Court).

Prior to 1802, there was no way to call upon the Supreme Court to resolve one-to-one ties on the circuit courts. Alexander Dallas, the Supreme Court reporter (and also the reporter of an eclectic assortment of cases from state and federal courts in Pennsylvania), noted in United States v. Worrall (C.C.D. Pa. 1798):

The Court being divided in opinion, it became a doubt, whether sentence could be pronounced upon the defendant; and a wish was expressed by the Judges and the Attorney of the District, that the case might be put into such a form, as would admit of obtaining the ultimate decision of the Supreme Court, upon the important principle of the discussion: But the counsel for the prisoner [Dallas himself] did not think themselves authorized to enter into a compromise of that nature.

Worrall involved a criminal prosecution of Robert Worrall for bribing Tench Coxe, the Commissioner of Revenue within the Department of the Treasury. After Worrall's conviction by jury, Dallas had moved for a judgment of acquittal on the ground that the Judiciary Act of 1789 did not empower the circuit court to try common law crimes (in 1798, there was no federal statute criminalizing the bribery of the relevant federal official). Despite the divided opinion in the circuit court, Worrall was sentenced to three months imprisonment and fined $200. The "short consultation" referred to in the official report, prior to the pronouncement of the reduced sentence, may have been with other members of the Supreme Court, which was then resident in Philadelphia.

== Statutory basis ==
The Judiciary Act of 1802 permitted circuit courts to certify questions of law to the Supreme Court if the judges were divided on that question. Specifically, § 6 provided:

Whenever any question should occur before a circuit court, upon which the opinions of the judges shall be opposed, the point upon which the disagreement shall happen, shall, during the same term, upon the request of either party, or their counsel, be stated under the direction of the judges, and certified under the seal of the court, to the supreme court, at their next session to be held thereafter; and shall, by said court, be finally decided. And the decision of the supreme court, and their order in the premises, shall be remitted to the circuit court, and be there entered of record, and shall have effect according to the nature of the said judgment and order: Provided, that nothing herein contained shall prevent the cause from proceeding, if, in the opinion of the court, farther proceedings can be had without prejudice to the merits: and provided also, that imprisonment shall not be allowed, nor punishment in any case be inflicted, where the judges of the said court are divided in opinion upon the question touching said imprisonment or punishment.

An 1872 statute modified the certificate of division procedure to require waiting for a final decision in the circuit court case first. In the interim, the opinion of the presiding judge was to prevail. An 1874 statute repealed the 1872 modification as to criminal cases, but left it in place as to civil cases.

While the statute provided only for the certification of "the point upon which the disagreement shall happen," the justices sometimes took the liberty of enlarging the question. For example, in United States v. Hudson (1812), the question certified was "whether the Circuit Court of the United States had a common law jurisdiction in cases of libel?" but the question answered was "whether the Circuit Courts of the United States can exercise a common law jurisdiction in criminal cases?" And, in United States v. Bevans (1818), the Court noted that "[i]t may be deemed within the scope of the question certified to this court" to inquire whether the murder was cognizable under § 3 of the Crimes Act of 1790, even though the defendant had only been indicted under § 8.

== History of use ==
Certificates of division began to fall into disuse as it became increasingly common for the circuit courts to sit with a single judge. The Judiciary Act of 1869 (the "Circuit Judges Act") reduced the circuit-riding duties of the Supreme Court justices and therefore reduced the possibility for certificates of division. As Chief Justice Marshall wrote, he did not have "the privilege of dividing the court when alone."

=== In criminal cases ===
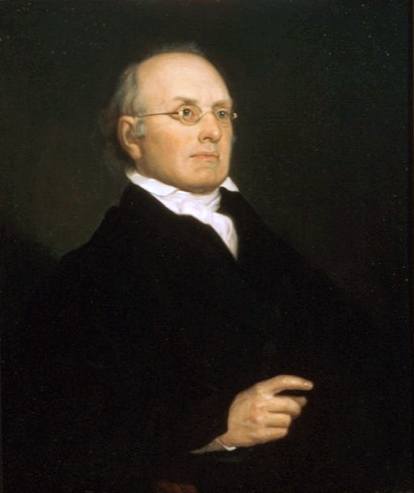
Justice Joseph Story wrote that common appeals in criminal cases, via a certificate of division, would result in "manifest obstruction of public justice."

In United States v. More (1805), the Court held that the ordinary means of appeal, the writ of error, could not be utilized in criminal cases from the circuit courts. This contributed to the importance of the certificate of division in criminal cases. The Marshall Court (1801–1835) heard thirty-one criminal cases arising from certificates of division; the Taney Court (1836–1864), fifteen; the Chase Court (1864–1873), seventeen; the Waite Court (1874–1888), thirty-eight; and the Fuller Court (1888–1910), fourteen.

The Judiciary Act of 1802 plainly contemplated that certificates of division would issue in criminal cases. Section 6 provided that "imprisonment shall not be allowed, nor punishment in any case be inflicted, where judges of the said court are divided in opinion upon the question touching the said imprisonment or punishment." Justice Story—in his opinions for the Court—cautioned against the too frequent use of certificates of division in criminal cases. In United States v. Gooding (1827), for the Court, Justice Story wrote:

We take this opportunity of expressing our anxiety, least, by too great indulgence to the wishes of counsel, questions of this sort should be frequently brought before this Court, and thus, in effect, an appeal in criminal cases become an ordinary proceeding to the manifest obstruction of public justice, and against the plain intendment of the acts of Congress.

Not every question or every criminal case was eligible for a certificate of division. In United States v. Daniel (1821), the Court held that a motion for a new trial—as authorized by the § 17 of the Judiciary Act of 1789—could not be the subject of a certificate of division; rather, the division would operate a rejection of the motion. Similarly, in United States v. Bailey (1835), the Court held that the question of whether the evidence was legally sufficient to support the offense charged could not be certified. In United States v. Briggs (Briggs I) (1847), the Court further limited its jurisdiction to hear criminal certificates of division by holding that the question of whether a demurrer to an indictment should be sustained was too general to be certified.

In United States v. Hamilton (1883), the Court reaffirmed its earlier holdings that certificates could not issue from motions to quash an indictment. And, in United States v. Rosenburgh (1868) and United States v. Avery (1871), the Court held that a motion to quash an indictment could not be so certified, even if the motion called into question the jurisdiction of the circuit court.

=== In habeas cases ===
In Ex parte Tom Tong (1883), the Court held that—under 1872 amendments to the certification procedure, which went into effect during the Chase Court era—because habeas corpus was a civil proceeding, questions arising in habeas cases could not be certified to the Supreme Court until a final judgment had been entered. In Ex parte Milligan (1866), after the repeal of those amendments, the Court held that habeas petitions in the circuit courts could be a source of certified questions to the Supreme Court.

=== In civil cases ===
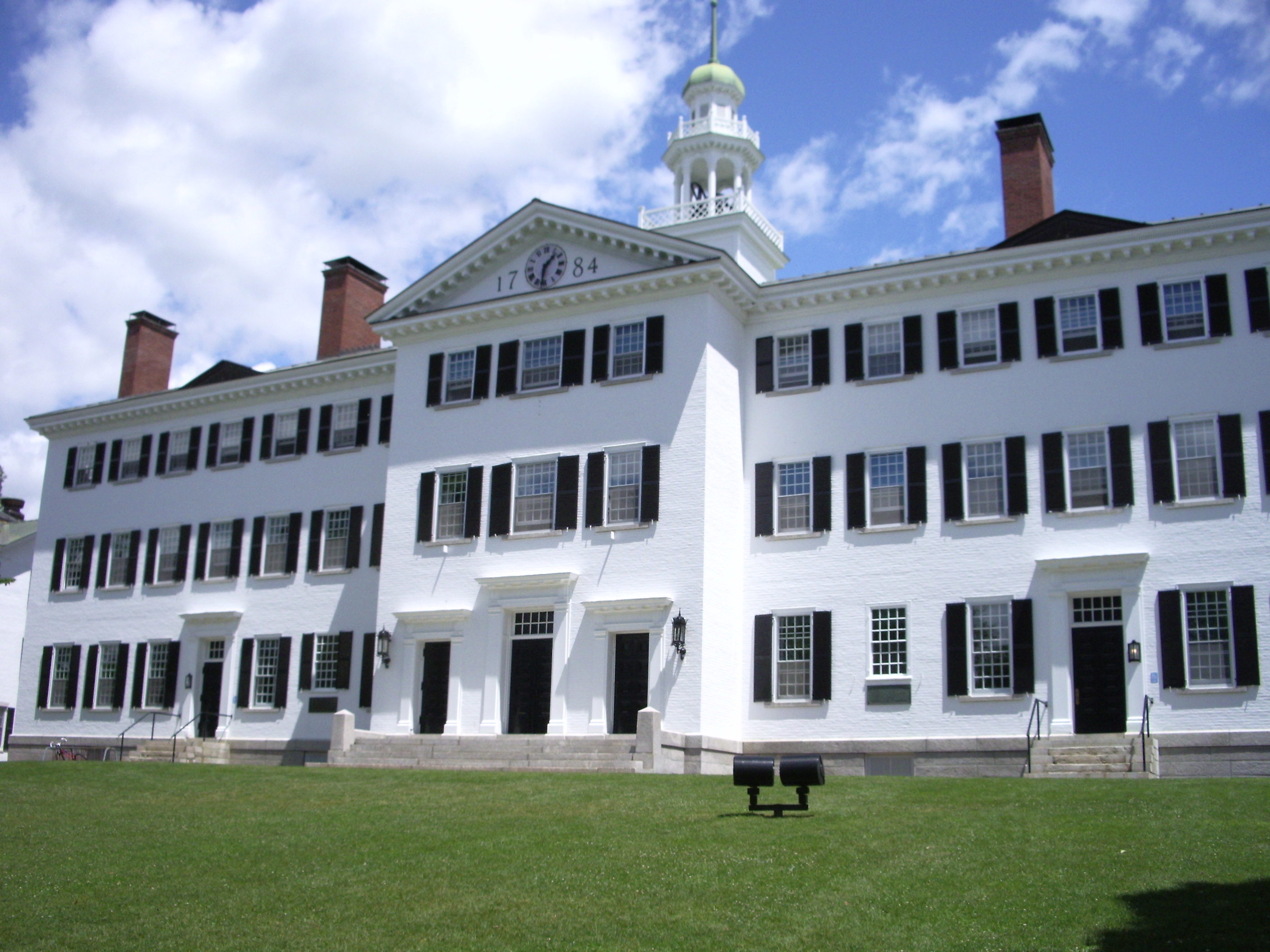
Lawyer Daniel Webster and Justice Joseph Story collaborated to ensure the availability of a certificate of division in the Dartmouth College (pictured) case.

Dartmouth College v. Woodward (1819) is a famous use of the certificate of division procedure in a civil case. In order to insure that the certificate of division procedure would be available in Dartmouth College, "Story was closely involved from the outset with the litigation." Early on, Dartmouth's lawyer, Daniel Webster, sought "to elicit the cooperation of Story in carrying the case to the Marshall Court through a pro forma certificate of division." The Contract Clause question for which Dartmouth College is famous could have been appealed to the Supreme Court even if the case had been brought in the courts of New Hampshire (and it was); but, the "vested rights" argument, which Story and Webster regarded as potentially stronger, was not a matter of federal law and thus could not be appealed by writ of error. In fact, after the New Hampshire Supreme Court ruled against the College, in addition to filing an appeal, a new case was filed in the federal circuit court. As Webster wrote in a letter to another lawyer for the College:

I have no doubt [that Justice Story] will [be] incline[d] to send up the new cause in the most convenient manner, without giving any opinion, and probably without an argument. If the district judge will agree to divide without argument, pro forma, I think Judge Story will incline so to dispose of the cause.

Although Story did as Webster predicted, the certificate of division was never heard by the Supreme Court because the direct appeal was decided first.

== Certificates not decided ==
In addition to the Dartmouth College case (supra), there are other reports of certificates of division that were issued but never decided by the Supreme Court. After the indictment of Jefferson Davis, the President of the Confederacy, for treason, William Wirt Henry reports that a certificate of division was issued on Davis's motion to dismiss the indictment on the grounds that he owed no allegiance to the United States after the secession of his state. Reportedly, Chief Justice Salmon P. Chase sided with Davis, while District Judge John Curtiss Underwood sided with the government. No response from the Supreme Court to that certificate is reported, but Davis's bail was eventually absolved, and he was released.

== Abolition ==
=== Criminal cases ===
In 1889, Congress created a right of ordinary appeal in capital cases. The 1889 act was "[t]he first act of Congress which authorized a criminal case to be brought from the Circuit Court of the United States to this court, except upon a certificate of division of opinion." In 1891, with the Judiciary Act of 1891 (the "Evarts Act"), Congress extended this right to other serious crimes. The 1891 act did not explicitly repeal the authorization to issue certificates of division, but § 14 provided that prior, inconsistent laws were repealed.

After the passage of the 1891 act, the Supreme Court initially continued to decide questions presented in criminal cases by certificate of division on the merits. Three such decisions, United States v. Eaton (1892), United States v. Rodgers (1893), and United States v. Thomas (1894), made no mention of the 1891 act. (Note: United States v. Brewer, 139 U.S. 278 (1891), while decided after the passage of the Judiciary Act of 1891, was certified and argued before.) But, in United States v. Rider (1896) and United States v. Hewecker (1896), the Court held that the 1891 act was an implied repeal of the authorization of certificates of division in criminal cases. Rider held:

We are of opinion that the scheme of the act of March 3, 1891, precludes the contention that certificates of division of opinion may still be had under sections 651 and 697 of the Revised Statutes.

Review by appeal, by writ of error or otherwise, must be as prescribed by the act, and review by certificate is limited by the act to the certificate by the Circuit Courts, made after final judgment, of questions raised as to their own jurisdiction and to the certificate by the Circuit Courts of Appeals of questions of law in relation to which our advice is sought as therein provided, and these certificates are governed by the same general rules as were formerly applied to certificates of division.

It is true that repeals by implication are not favored, but we cannot escape the conclusion that, tested by its scope, its obvious purpose, and its terms, the act of March 3, 1891, covers the whole subject-matter under consideration, and furnishes the exclusive rule in respect of appellate jurisdiction on appeal, writ of error or certificate.

Hewecker, the last criminal certificate of division case, declined to reconsider the question on the grounds that Rider could have been decided on the narrower ground that a certificate of division could not issue on a matter committed to the district judge's discretion.

=== Civil cases ===
Following Rider and Hewecker, certificates of division continued to be issued in civil cases. Felsenheld v. United States (1902) was the last civil certificate of division case. The possibility of civil certificates of division was not completely abolished until the Judicial Code of 1911 abolished the circuit courts.

== Other forms of certification ==
The modern form of Supreme Court certified question jurisdiction was enacted in 1925 and amended in 1949. 28 U.S.C. § 1254 provides:

Cases in the courts of appeals may be reviewed by the Supreme Court by the following methods:

(1) By writ of certiorari granted upon the petition of any party to any civil or criminal case, before or after rendition of judgment or decree;
(2) By certification at any time by a court of appeals of any question of law in any civil or criminal case as to which instructions are desired, and upon such certification the Supreme Court may give binding instructions or require the entire record to be sent up for decision of the entire matter in controversy.

Section 1254(1) represents the far more common route: certiorari, the source of nearly all the Supreme Court's current docket. Section 1254(2) represents a less common route: certification. Pursuant to § 1254(2), the Supreme Court heard 72 certified question cases between 1927 and 1936; 20 between 1937 and 1946; and only four between 1947 and 2010. In modern jurisprudence, § 1254(2) certification has become very rare. For example, when the en banc Fifth Circuit attempted to certify a question in 2009 (also a rare occurrence), the Supreme Court summarily declined to consider the case. Certified questions are also governed by Supreme Court Rule 19.

== Analysis ==
Several scholars have argued that certificates of division were pro forma, and that the judge and justice would merely agree to disagree, often without writing opposing opinions. For example, with the circuit court decision leading up to United States v. Marchant (1827), the reporter records that "[t]he district judge concurred in this opinion; but as it was a matter of not infrequent occurrence, and important to the practice of the court, the judges afterwards divided in opinion for the purpose of obtaining a solemn decision of the superior court." Similarly, the United States v. Ortega (1826) circuit court opinion notes that the "point was taken to the supreme court upon a proforma certificate of a division of opinion in this court."

White writes that "the certificate of division procedure constituted the principal opportunity by which they could control their docket." It was common for Marshall Court justices, while riding circuit or on vacation, to exchange letters about cases in the circuit courts which might be appropriate for certificates of division.

== Bibliography ==
- Gary D. Rowe, The Sound of Silence: United States v. Hudson & Goodwin, the Jeffersonian Ascendancy, and the Abolition of Federal Common Law Crimes, 101 Yale L.J. 919 (1992).
- G. Edward White, The Working Life of the Marshall Court, 1815–1835, 70 Va. L. Rev. 1 (1984).
- G. Edward White, The Marshall Court and Cultural Change, 1815–35 (1988).
- G. Edward White, The Marshall Court and International Law: The Piracy Cases, 83 Am. J. Int'l L. 727 (1989).
- G. Edward White, Neglected Justices: Discounting for History, 62 Vand. L. Rev. 319 (2009).
