= List of United States Supreme Court cases, volume 45 =

Supreme Court of the United States
- Interactive map of Supreme Court of the United States
- 38°53′26″N 77°00′16″W
- Established: March 4, 1789; 236 years ago
- Location: Washington, D.C.
- Coordinates: 38°53′26″N 77°00′16″W
- Composition method: Presidential nomination with Senate confirmation
- Authorised by: Constitution of the United States, Art. III, § 1
- Judge term length: life tenure, subject to impeachment and removal
- Number of positions: 9 (by statute)
- Website: supremecourt.gov

This is a list of cases reported in volume 45 (4 How.) of United States Reports, decided by the Supreme Court of the United States in 1845 and 1846.

== Nominative reports ==
In 1874, the U.S. government created the United States Reports, and retroactively numbered older privately published case reports as part of the new series. As a result, cases appearing in volumes 1–90 of U.S. Reports have dual citation forms; one for the volume number of U.S. Reports, and one for the volume number of the reports named for the relevant reporter of decisions (these are called "nominative reports").

=== Benjamin Chew Howard ===
Starting with the 42nd volume of U.S. Reports, the Reporter of Decisions of the Supreme Court of the United States was Benjamin Chew Howard. Howard was Reporter of Decisions from 1843 to 1860, covering volumes 42 through 65 of United States Reports which correspond to volumes 1 through 24 of his Howard's Reports. As such, the dual form of citation to, for example, Cookendorfer v. Preston is 45 U.S. (4 How.) 317 (1846).

== Justices of the Supreme Court at the time of 45 U.S. (4 How.) ==
The Supreme Court is established by Article III, Section 1 of the Constitution of the United States, which says: "The judicial Power of the United States, shall be vested in one supreme Court . . .". The size of the Court is not specified; the Constitution leaves it to Congress to set the number of justices. Under the Judiciary Act of 1789 Congress originally fixed the number of justices at six (one chief justice and five associate justices). Since 1789 Congress has varied the size of the Court from six to seven, nine, ten, and back to nine justices (always including one chief justice).

Due to an unfilled vacancy, when the cases in 45 U.S. (4 How.) were decided the Court comprised only these eight members:

Portrait	Justice	Office	Home State	Succeeded	Date confirmed by the Senate (Vote)	Tenure on Supreme Court
	Roger B. Taney	Chief Justice	Maryland	John Marshall	March 15, 1836 (29–15)	March 28, 1836 – October 12, 1864 (Died)
	John McLean	Associate Justice	Ohio	Robert Trimble	March 7, 1829 (Acclamation)	January 11, 1830 – April 4, 1861 (Died)
	James Moore Wayne	Associate Justice	Georgia	William Johnson	January 9, 1835 (Acclamation)	January 14, 1835 – July 5, 1867 (Died)
	John Catron	Associate Justice	Tennessee	newly created seat	March 8, 1837 (28–15)	May 1, 1837 – May 30, 1865 (Died)
	John McKinley	Associate Justice	Alabama	newly created seat	September 25, 1837 (Acclamation)	January 9, 1838 – July 19, 1852 (Died)
	Peter Vivian Daniel	Associate Justice	Virginia	Philip P. Barbour	March 2, 1841 (25–5)	January 10, 1842 – May 31, 1860 (Died)
	Samuel Nelson	Associate Justice	New York	Smith Thompson	February 14, 1845 (Acclamation)	February 27, 1845 – November 28, 1872 (Retired)
	Levi Woodbury	Associate Justice	New Hampshire	Joseph Story	January 31, 1846 (Acclamation)	September 23, 1845 – September 4, 1851 (Died)

== Citation style ==
Under the Judiciary Act of 1789 the federal court structure at the time comprised District Courts, which had general trial jurisdiction; Circuit Courts, which had mixed trial and appellate (from the US District Courts) jurisdiction; and the United States Supreme Court, which had appellate jurisdiction over the federal District and Circuit courts—and for certain issues over state courts. The Supreme Court also had limited original jurisdiction (i.e., in which cases could be filed directly with the Supreme Court without first having been heard by a lower federal or state court). There were one or more federal District Courts and/or Circuit Courts in each state, territory, or other geographical region.

Bluebook citation style is used for case names, citations, and jurisdictions.

- "C.C.D." = United States Circuit Court for the District of . . .
  - e.g.,"C.C.D.N.J." = United States Circuit Court for the District of New Jersey
- "D." = United States District Court for the District of . . .
  - e.g.,"D. Mass." = United States District Court for the District of Massachusetts
- "E." = Eastern; "M." = Middle; "N." = Northern; "S." = Southern; "W." = Western
  - e.g.,"C.C.S.D.N.Y." = United States Circuit Court for the Southern District of New York
  - e.g.,"M.D. Ala." = United States District Court for the Middle District of Alabama
- "Ct. Cl." = United States Court of Claims
- The abbreviation of a state's name alone indicates the highest appellate court in that state's judiciary at the time.
  - e.g.,"Pa." = Supreme Court of Pennsylvania
  - e.g.,"Me." = Supreme Judicial Court of Maine

== List of cases in 45 U.S. (4 How.) ==
Case Name	Page and year	Opinion of the Court	Concurring opinion(s)	Dissenting opinion(s)	Lower court	Disposition
Gwinn v. Buchanan	1 (1845)	Taney	none	none	C.C.D. Miss.	reversed
Brown v. Clarke	4 (1846)	Nelson	none	none	N.D. Miss.	affirmed
Tombigbee Railroad Company v. Kneeland	16 (1845)	Taney	none	none	M.D. Ala.	reversed
Levi v. Thompson	17 (1845)	Wayne	none	none	Iowa	affirmed
Buchanan v. Alexander	20 (1845)	per curiam	none	none	Va. Cir. Ct.	reversed
Spalding v. People	21 (1845)	Taney	none	none	N.Y.	affirmed
Beals v. Hale	37 (1846)	Woodbury	none	none	C.C.D. Mich.	certification
Maney v. Porter	55 (1845)	Taney	none	none	Tenn.	dismissed
Erwin's Lessee v. Dundas	58 (1845)	Nelson	none	none	C.C.S.D. Ala.	affirmed
Gratiot v. United States	80 (1846)	Wayne	none	McLean	C.C.D. Mo.	affirmed
Paige v. Sessions	122 (1846)	McLean	none	none	C.C.S.D. Miss.	affirmed
Garrard v. Reynold's Lessee	123 (1845)	Nelson	none	none	C.C.D. Ky.	affirmed
Brandon v. Loftus	127 (1845)	Catron	none	none	C.C.S.D. Miss.	affirmed
Garland v. Davis	131 (1846)	Woodbury	none	none	C.C.D.C.	reversed
Stockton v. Bishop	155 (1846)	Catron	none	none	C.C.W.D. Pa.	affirmed
Jourdan v. Barrett	169 (1846)	Catron	none	none	La.	reversed
Carpenter v. Providence Washington Insurance Company	185 (1846)	Woodbury	none	none	C.C.D.R.I.	affirmed
Agricultural Bank v. Rice	225 (1846)	Taney	none	none	C.C.S.D. Miss.	affirmed
Clifton v. United States	242 (1846)	Nelson	none	none	C.C.E.D. Pa.	affirmed
Buckley v. United States	251 (1846)	Wayne	none	none	C.C.E.D. Pa.	affirmed
Musson v. Lake	262 (1846)	McKinley	none	Woodbury	C.C.S.D. Miss.	certification
United States v. McLemore	286 (1846)	McLean	Wayne	none	C.C.D.M. Tenn.	dismissed
Zeller's Lessee v. Eckert	289 (1846)	Nelson	none	none	C.C.E.D. Pa.	affirmed
Knox v. Smith	298 (1846)	McLean	none	none	C.C.D.W. Tenn.	affirmed
Cookendorfer v. Preston	317 (1846)	McLean	none	none	C.C.D.C.	affirmed
Rankin v. Hoyt	327 (1845)	Woodbury	none	none	C.C.S.D.N.Y.	affirmed
Harris v. Robinson	336 (1846)	Woodbury	none	McLean	N.D. Ala.	affirmed
Foxcroft v. Mallett	353 (1846)	Woodbury	none	none	C.C.D. Me.	affirmed
Stimpson v. West Chester Railroad Company	380 (1846)	McLean	none	none	C.C.E.D. Pa.	reversed
Smyth v. Strader	404 (1845)	McLean	Catron	none	C.C.S.D. Ala.	reversed
Mackay v. Dillon	421 (1846)	Catron	none	none	Mo.	reversed
Les Bois v. Bramell	449 (1846)	Catron	none	none	C.C.D. Mo.	affirmed
Brown v. Union Bank	465 (1846)	McLean	none	none	Ct. App. Terr. Fla.	dismissed
Aspden v. Nixon	467 (1846)	Catron	none	none	C.C.E.D. Pa.	certification
Downes v. Scott	500 (1846)	McLean	none	none	La. Dist. Ct.	dismissed
Michoud v. Girod	503 (1846)	Wayne	none	none	C.C.E.D. La.	affirmed
United States v. Rogers	567 (1846)	Taney	none	none	C.C.D.C.	certification
Barry v. Mercein	574 (1846)	Taney	none	none	C.C.S.D.N.Y.	continued
Bradford v. Williams	576 (1846)	Nelson	none	none	Ct. App. Terr. Fla.	affirmed
Hunt v. Palao	589 (1846)	Taney	none	none	Ct. App. Terr. Fla.	dismissed
Rhode Island v. Massachusetts	591 (1846)	McLean	Taney	none	original	dismissed
Hardeman v. Anderson	640 (1846)	McLean	none	none	C.C.S.D. Miss.	supersedeas granted
Holliday v. Batson	645 (1846)	Taney	none	none	C.C.E.D. La.	dismissed
Wilson v. Rousseau	646 (1846)	Nelson	none	McLean, Wayne, Woodbury	C.C.N.D.N.Y.	certification
Simpson v. Wilson	709 (1846)	Nelson	none	none	C.C.D. La.	certification
Wilson v. Turner	712 (1846)	Nelson	none	none	C.C.N.D.N.Y.	affirmed
Woodworth v. Wilson	712 (1846)	Nelson	none	none	C.C.D. Ky.	reversed

== See also ==
- Certificate of division
