= United States v. Rogers =

- Supreme Court of the United States

Argued March 2, 1846 Decided March 9, 1846
- Full case name: United States v. William S. Rogers
- Citations: 45 U.S. 567 (more) 4 How. 567; 11 L. Ed. 1105

Holding
- A white man, adopted into an Indian tribe, does not become an Indian for the purposes of criminal jurisdiction.

Court membership
- Chief Justice Roger B. Taney Associate Justices John McLean · James M. Wayne; John Catron · John McKinley; Peter V. Daniel · Samuel Nelson; Levi Woodbury

Case opinion
- Majority: Taney

United States v. Rogers, 45 U.S. (4 How.) 567 (1846), was a case in which the Supreme Court of the United States holding that a white man, adopted into an Indian tribe, does not become an Indian for the purposes of criminal jurisdiction.

== Background ==
In 1844, William S. Rogers, a white man and Cherokee Nation citizen by marriage, murdered his brother-in-law Jacob Nicholson, another white man and Cherokee Nation citizen by marriage. Rogers was from Tennessee and enlisted in June 1836 to help with Cherokee removal. He was discharged a month later and married a Cherokee woman in November 1836 and was removed with her to Indian Territory. Rogers wife died in 1843 and he murdered Nicholson for an unknown reason on September 1, 1844, within the Cherokee Nation in Indian Territory. On April 2, 1845, Cherokee Nation Sheriff Alexander Foreman captured Rogers and he was given to the federal garrison at Fort Gibson pending a trial in the Cherokee Nation's courts.

Within two weeks of his arrest, Rogers was sent to Little Rock for trial in federal court. Rogers was indicted for the murder of Jacob Nicholson by the grand jury for the United States District Court for the District of Arkansas.

=== Lower court case ===
On April 18, 1845, Rogers plead pro se that since he and his victim were both Cherokee citizens the federal government lacked jurisdiction under the Trade and Intercourse Act of 1834. While Judge Benjamin Johnson agreed the United States lacked jurisdiction, Justice Peter V. Daniel disagreed while in town riding the circuit which triggered an automatic appeal under the Judiciary Act of 1793.

== Oral Arguments ==
On May 12, 1845, Rogers escaped the Little Rock Jail with another prisoner and drowned while crossing the Arkansas River. Two months after Rogers' death, the district court clerk for the U.S. District Court for the District of Arkansas certified the record of the case for appeal while failing to notify the court of Rogers' death. In March 1846 the court heard oral arguments from U.S. attorney general John Y. Mason and no one appeared for the defense.

== Opinion of the Court ==
Chief Justice Roger B. Taney delivered the opinion of the court. Taney noted that while the Cherokee nation and their treaties with the United States did have bearing, Rogers "was still a white man, of the white race, and therefore not within the exception in the act of Congress." He noted the act's jurisdictional "exception is confined to those who by the usages and customs of the Indians are regarded as belonging to their race. It does not speak of members of a tribe, but of the race generally."

The Rogers test, derived from the cases, is used for determining whether a defendant is an "Indian" under federal law for purposes of criminal jurisdiction. Under the test, courts look for both "Indian blood" and recognition as an Indian (usually interpreted as citizenship in a federally recognized tribe).

== Analysis ==
Law professor Bethany R. Berger notes the decision is inconsistent with Taney's other writing on Indian law and likely was heavily written by or copied from arguments made by U.S. attorney Samuel Hempstead and attorney general John Y. Mason.

== Works cited ==
- Berger, Bethany R. (2004). ""Power Over this Unfortunate Race": Race, Politics and Indian Law in United States v. Rogers". William and Mary Law Review. 45 (5): 1957–2052.
- Summers, Clint (2018). "Rethinking the Federal Indian Status Test: A Look at the Supreme Court's Classification of the Freedmen of the Five Civilized Tribes of Oklahoma". American Indian Law Journal. 7 (1): 194–229.
