= Remington–Keene rifle =

- Type: Rifle
- Place of origin: United States

Service history
- Used by: United States Navy

Production history
- Designer: John W. Keene
- Designed: 1878
- Manufacturer: Remington Arms
- Unit cost: $17.50
- No. built: 5,000
- Variants: See text

Specifications
- Mass: 9 lb (4.1 kg)
- Length: 48 in (120 cm)
- Barrel length: 29.25 in (74.3 cm)
- Cartridge: .45-70
- Action: Bolt action
- Feed system: 9-round tubular magazine
- Sights: Folding leaf

The Remington–Keene is an early bolt-action rifle with a tubular magazine.

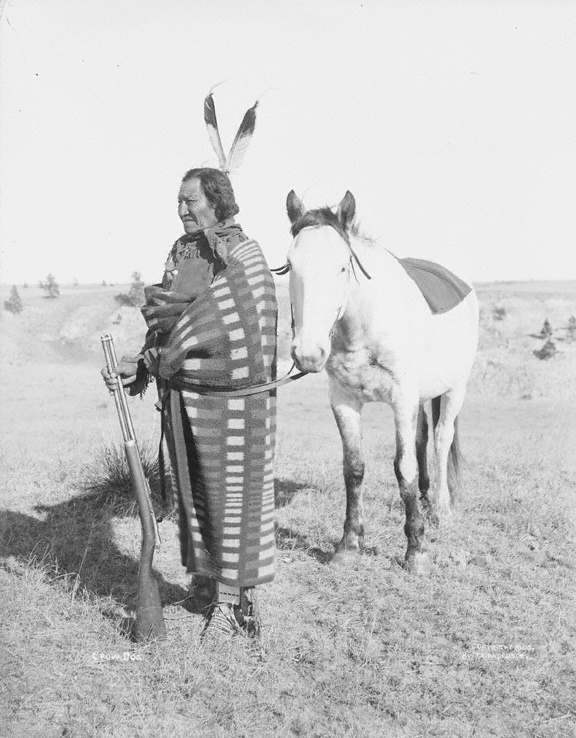
Subchief Crow Dog with a Remington–Keene rifle, ca. 1898.

Remington manufactured prototypes of Keene's patents for consideration by the United States Army Ordnance Department Magazine Gun Board convened in 1878. Although the Army rejected the design in favor of the Winchester-Hotchkiss, Remington commenced production and offered the rifle to the United States Navy Bureau of Ordnance. The Navy purchased 250 rifles for comparison with their 2,500 Hotchkiss rifles and 300 M1885 Remington-Lee rifles. The Remington–Keene rifles were delivered in 1880 with US and an anchor stamped on the left side of the barrel and WWK and P (proof) stamped on the right side of the barrel by Lieutenant William W. Kimball. These rifles remained in service for less than a decade aboard USS Trenton (1876) and USS Michigan (1843). In July 1880 the United States Department of the Interior purchased 600 Frontier Model carbines with 24 in (61 cm) barrels to arm the Indian Police on a number of reservations in the western United States. Rifles were manufactured for civilian sales chambered for .45-70, .40-60 Winchester, and .43 Spanish.

== See also ==
- 1888 Henri-Pieper, similar hammer-fired bolt action rifle
- Murata repeating rifle
