= Criminal law in the Chase Court =

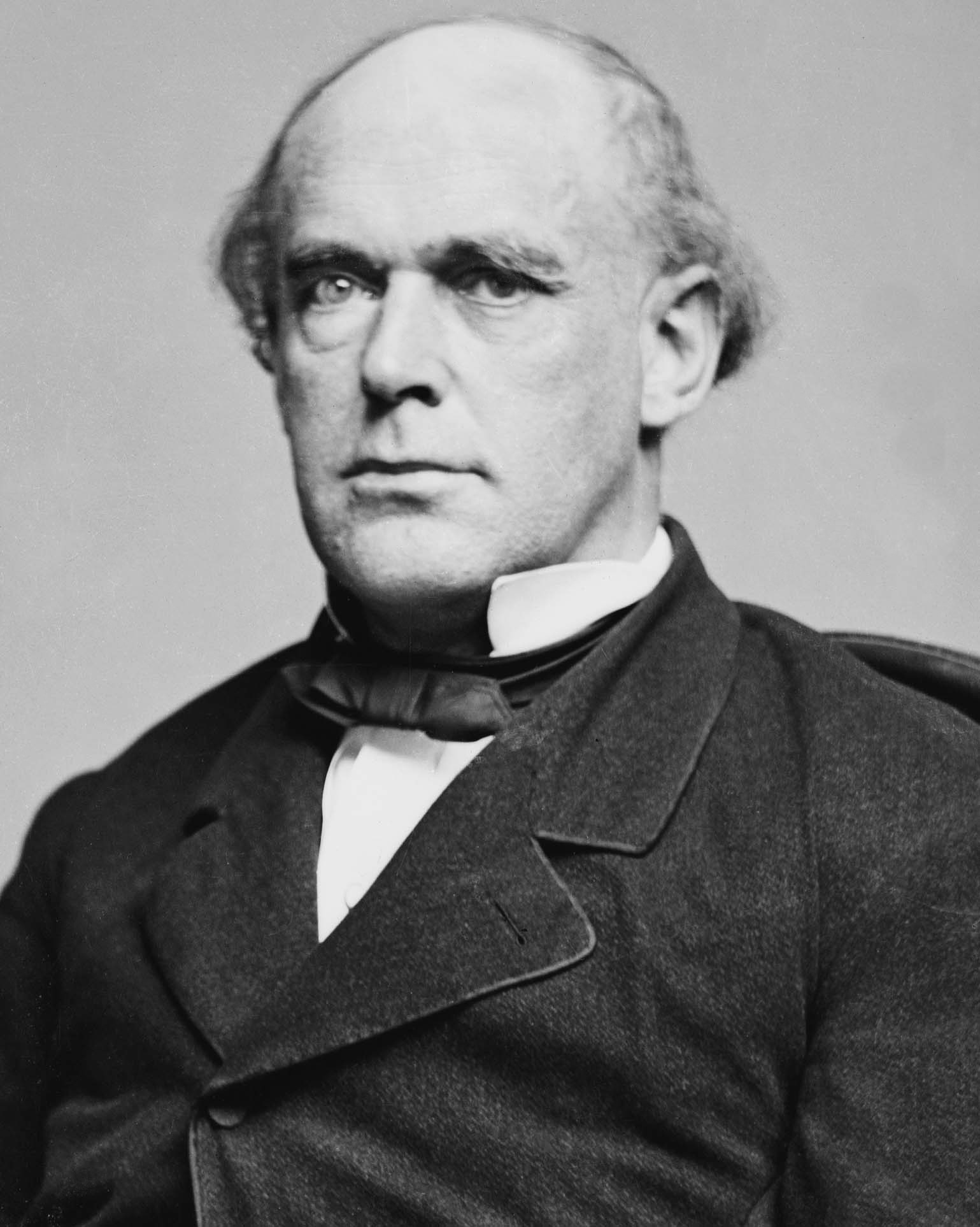
Chief Justice Salmon P. Chase

The Chase Court (1864–1873) issued thirty-five opinions in criminal cases over nine years, at a significantly higher rate than the Marshall Court or Taney Court before it. Notable such cases include Ex parte Milligan (1866), Pervear v. Massachusetts (1866), Ex parte McCardle (1867, 1869), Ex parte Yerger (1868), and United States v. Kirby (1868).

An array of Reconstruction-era statutes created new federal crimes and new sources of federal jurisdiction to hear criminal cases—both by removal and writs of habeas corpus.

== Background ==
During the tenure of Chief Justice Salmon P. Chase, the fundamental structure of the federal criminal system—arising from the Judiciary Act of 1789—underwent several legislative modifications. According to Wiecek, "[i]n no comparable period of our nation's history have the federal courts, lower and Supreme, enjoyed as great an expansion of their jurisdiction as they did in the years of Reconstruction, 1863 to 1876."

First, in 1866, Congress authorized the removal of criminal cases from state courts to federal courts in certain situations (known as "civil rights removal"). The act provided:

That the district courts of the United States, within their respective districts, shall have . . . cognizance . . . , concurrently with the circuit courts of the United States, of all causes, civil and criminal, affecting persons who are denied or cannot enforce in the courts or the judicial tribunals of the State or locality where they may be any of the rights secured to them by the first section of this act; and if any suit or prosecution, civil or criminal, affecting persons who are denied or cannot enforce in the courts or the judicial tribunals of the State or locality where they may be any of the rights secured to them by the first section of this act . . . .

Second, in 1867, Congress broadened the authority of the federal courts to hear habeas petitions, and authorized the Supreme Court to hear direct appeals from the adjudication of those petitions in the lower federal courts (as an alternative to original habeas). Most notably, the 1867 act extended the power of the federal courts to hear habeas petitions from state prisoners (although the Chase Court heard no such cases). Further, by explicitly providing for appeals from habeas petitions in lower federal courts, the act abrogated the Supreme Court's decision in Barry v. Mercein (1847), which held that such appeals could not be maintained as writs of error under § 22 of the Judiciary Act of 1789. The following year, while Ex parte McCardle was pending before the Supreme Court, Congress repealed the portion of the act that authorized the Supreme Court to hear habeas appeals from the circuit courts.

Third, the Judiciary Act of 1869, also known as the Circuit Judges Act, created full-time judges to sit on the circuit courts. While the act did not eliminate the obligation of Supreme Court justices to "ride circuit," or sit as circuit judges, it reduced the practice and accordingly reduced the availability of certificates of division in criminal cases.

Fourth, the United States Department of Justice was created in 1870.

Fifth, in 1872, Congress modified the procedure for adjudicating certificates of division. In civil suits, the amendment provided that the opinion of the presiding judge (the Supreme Court justice) would prevail in the interim and that the Supreme Court would not decide the certified question of law until the circuit court entered a final decision in the matter. But, in criminal case, the procedure remained essentially the same as it had been under the Judiciary Act of 1802.

== Sources of jurisdiction ==
=== Writ of error ===
==== Circuit courts ====
The Marshall Court had held that it lacked the jurisdiction to consider writs of error to the circuit courts in criminal cases. The Taney Court had not heard any such cases. But, in Blyew v. United States (1871), the Court heard a writ of error from a criminal action removed to the circuit court under the criminal rights removal provision. The opinion in Blyew does not discuss the jurisdictional question, but the reporter does note that: "Some discussion not material to be reported, was also had at the bar by the counsel on both sides, as to whether the case was properly brought here by writ of error . . . ." Section 22 of the Judiciary Act of 1789 had explicitly authorized appeals in removed cases. Over the dissent of Justices Bradley and Swayne, the Court held that civil rights removal was improper on the grounds that the criminal defendant wished to call an African-American witness who were regarded as incompetent to testify under state law.

==== State courts ====
The Chase Court heard ten writs of error from criminal convictions in the state courts (as authorized by § 25 of the Judiciary Act of 1789 and its progeny). Three such cases found that § 25 authority lacking without reaching the merits. In Rankin v. Tennessee (1870), the Court for the first time rejected a criminal appeal under § 25 due to a lack of finality of the state court judgment. And, in Ward v. Maryland (1870), the Court held that the advancement of such cases on the Court's calendar was purely discretionary. And, in Aicardi v. Alabama (1873), the Court held that it could not review a state court's interpretation of the state's criminal statutes or the consistency of such criminal statutes with the state's constitution.

Nevertheless, In McGuire v. Massachusetts (1865) and Pervear v. Massachusetts (1866), the Court held that a federal liquor license does not grant immunity from prosecution under state liquor laws. And, in Cummings v. Missouri (1866), the Court reversed the conviction of a Catholic priest who had refused to take an anti-Confederacy loyalty oath as required by the Missouri constitution. But, in Klinger v. Missouri (1871), the Court permitted the exclusion of a criminal juror who had refused to take that oath; because the juror professed that he still supported the rebellion, that was reason enough to exclude him, and thus the failure to take the unconstitutional oath was not the reason for his exclusion.

==== Territorial courts ====
Like the Taney Court before it, the Chase Court entertained criminal appeals from the federal territorial courts. In United States v. Hart (1867), the Court held that a statute empowering a territorial court to hear revenue cases did not authorize the Court to try a criminal prosecution for treason. And, in Snow v. United States (1873), the Court held that the Attorney General of Utah, not the federal district attorney, had the authority to prosecute crime in the Utah territory.

=== Habeas appeals ===
The Supreme Court never had an opportunity to exercise the authority to hear appeals from habeas petitions in the circuit courts. In Ex parte McCardle (1867), the first such case, the Court denied a motion to dismiss, finding that it had such jurisdiction. William H. McCardle had been arrested by a military commission for violating the Military Reconstruction Act by publishing anti-Reconstruction editorials in the Vicksburg Times. Before the Court could reach the merits, Congress repealed said jurisdiction. In Ex parte McCardle (1869), the Court held that the repeal was a valid exercise of Congress's Exceptions Clause power.

=== Original habeas ===
In Ex parte Yerger (1868), the Court held that the jurisdiction strip at issue in McCardle did not revoke the Court's authority to hear original habeas petitions under § 14 of the Judiciary Act of 1789. Other than Yerger, the Court only had one additional opportunity to hear such an original habeas case.

=== Certificates of division ===
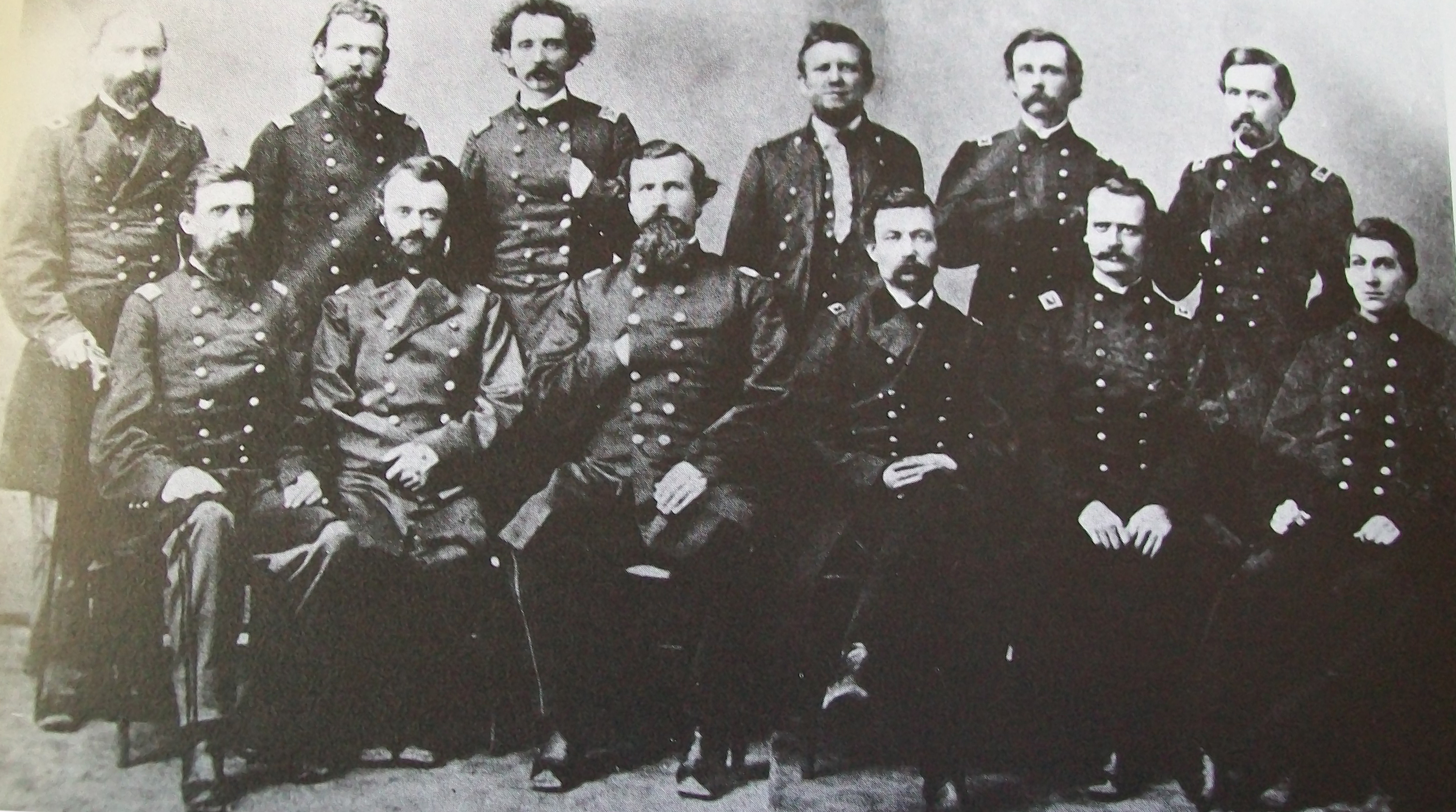
The military commission that convicted Milligan

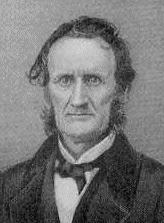
Lambdin P. Milligan

Despite intervening statutory developments that decreased the likelihood of division in the circuit courts, the Chase Court heard seventeen of its thirty-six criminal cases on certificates of division. In Ex parte Milligan (1866), the Court held that habeas petitions in the circuit courts could be a source of certified questions to the Supreme Court. But, in United States v. Rosenburgh (1868) and United States v. Avery (1871), the Court held that a motion to quash an indictment could not be so certified, even if the motion calls into question the jurisdiction of the circuit court.

=== Prerogative writs ===
In Ex parte Robinson (1873), on a petition for a writ of mandamus, the Court held that fines and imprisonment are the only punishments authorized by the Judiciary Act of 1789 for contempt of court. Thus, where attorney misconduct took place before a criminal grand jury, the Court held that the attorney could not be disbarred for contempt.

== Defining federal crimes ==
=== Alien crew members ===
In United States v. Tynen (1870), the Court overturned a conviction under a statute that required vessel owners to only employ U.S. citizen crew members. The Court held that a new statute which did no more than increase the punishment operated as an implied repeal of the first statute, and thus a conviction under the first statute was invalid.

=== Counterfeiting ===
In United States v. Howell (1870), the Court held that a counterfeiting statute was not void for repugnancy, distinguishing United States v. Cantril (1807), a decision of the Marshall Court interpreting a nearly identical statute.

=== Draft obstruction ===
A Civil War-era statute prohibited obstruction of the draft or the enrollment of members in the armed forces. The Court repeatedly upheld a strict division between the two prohibitions, holding that the draft obstruction provision did not apply to enrollment obstruction and vice versa.

=== Embezzlement ===
In United States v. Hartwell (1867), a prosecution for embezzlement of government funds under the Sub-Treasury Act, the Court held that the prohibition applied even to a relatively low level government official.

=== Liquor ===
In United States v. Holliday (1865), the Court upheld a criminal prohibition on selling liquor to Indians under the Indian Commerce Clause and held that the offense did not require that the sale take place on a reservation.

In the License Tax Cases (1866), the Court upheld a federal tax on liquor licenses (which was enforced by criminal prosecution).

=== Naptha mixing ===
In United States v. Dewitt (1869), the Court held that the federal naptha mixing prohibition was unconstitutional (except in areas under exclusive federal jurisdiction) because it infringed on the police power of the states.

=== Obstruction of the mail ===
In United States v. Kirby (1868), the Court held that the arrest of a mail carrier under a bench warrant was not prohibited by the mail obstruction statute.

== Criminal procedure ==
=== Constitutional issues ===
Double jeopardy

In Ex parte Lange (1873), the Court held that double jeopardy was violated by the imposition of a fine and imprisonment under a statute that authorized either fine or imprisonment. Since the defendant had already paid the fine, the Court held that the lower court could no longer even alter the sentence to mere imprisonment.

Ex post facto law

In Gut v. Minnesota (1869), the Court held that a retroactive change to Minnesota's criminal venue statute was not an unconstitutional ex post facto law.

Incorporation

In Pervear v. Massachusetts (1866), the Court held that the Eighth Amendment's prohibition on cruel and unusual punishment did not apply to the state governments, and—in the alternative, assuming that it did—a fine of $50 and three months hard labor was not an excessive punishment for bootlegging. And, in Twitchell v. Pennsylvania (1868), the Court held that the criminal procedure provisions of the Fifth and Sixth Amendments did not apply to the state governments.

=== Other ===
Sufficiency of an indictment

In United States v. Cook (1872), the Court held that—where a criminal statute both defines an offense and its exceptions—a criminal indictment must plead facts taking the case out of the exceptions if and only if the exception is inseparable from the definition of the offense. The Court held that the embezzlement statute at issue contained no such exceptions, and that the Crimes Act of 1790's statute of limitations was not such an exception.

Special verdicts

In United States v. Buzzo (1873), a prosecution for tax evasion, the Court held that where the jury is instructed to deliver a special verdict, the element of intent must be specifically included within the special verdict.

Statutory venue

In United States v. Arwo (1873), a prosecution for assault with a deadly weapon on the high seas, the Court found that the statutory venue provision—providing for venue in the first judicial district into which the defendant is brought—was satisfied.
