= Judiciary Act of 1891 =

US federal law creating appellate circuit courts below the Supreme Court

- Other short titles: Circuit Court of Appeals Act of 1891
- Long title: An Act to establish circuit courts of appeals and to define and regulate in certain cases the jurisdiction of the courts of the United States, and for other purposes.
- Nicknames: Evarts Act
- Enacted by: the 51st United States Congress
- Effective: March 3, 1891

Citations
- Statutes at Large: 26 Stat. 826

Legislative history
- Introduced in the Senate as S. 377 by William M. Evarts; Committee consideration by Senate Committee on the Judiciary; Passed the Senate on September 24, 1890; Passed the House on February 28, 1891 with amendment; Senate agreed to House amendment on March 2, 1891 () with further amendment; House agreed to Senate amendment on March 3, 1891 (); Signed into law by President Benjamin Harrison on March 3, 1891

The Judiciary Act of 1891 (26 Stat. 826), also known as the Circuit Court of Appeals Act of 1891, or the Evarts Act after its primary sponsor, Senator William M. Evarts, created the United States courts of appeals and reassigned the jurisdiction of most routine appeals from the district and circuit courts to these appellate courts. Therefore, it is also called the Circuit Courts of Appeals Act.

The Act created nine new courts that were originally known as the "United States circuit courts of appeals;" the name was changed to its current form in 1948. Each court was composed of two circuit judges and one district judge. The new courts had jurisdiction over most appeals of lower court decisions. The Supreme Court could review either legal issues that a court of appeals certified or decisions of court of appeals by writ of certiorari. The change resulted in an immediate reduction in the Supreme Court's workload (from 623 cases filed in 1890 to 379 in 1891 and 275 in 1892).

The Act also eliminated the requirement of "circuit riding" by Supreme Court justices under which the justices sat as trial judges on the U.S. circuit courts. The circuit courts themselves remained in existence, although without their former appellate jurisdiction, until they were abolished and their trial jurisdiction transferred to the district courts by the Judicial Code of 1911.

The Act allowed certain types of cases to be appealed directly to the Supreme Court (bypassing the new circuit courts of appeals), such as convictions for capital crimes; cases involving the construction or application of the United States Constitution; or cases in which a federal law or treaty or a state constitution or law was alleged to violate the U.S. Constitution.

== See also ==
- Certificate of division
