= Judiciary Act of 1793 =

- Other short titles: Anti-Injunction Act of 1793
- Long title: An Act in addition to the Act, entitled "An Act to establish the Judicial Courts of the United States"
- Enacted by: the 2nd United States Congress
- Effective: March 2, 1793

Citations
- Statutes at Large: 1 Stat. 333

Codification
- Acts amended: Judiciary Act of 1789

Legislative history
- Introduced in the Senate on January 1793; Signed into law by President George Washington on March 2, 1793

United States Supreme Court cases
- Wayman v. Southard (1825); Mitchum v. Foster (1972); Atlantic Coast Line R. Co. v. Brotherhood of Locomotive Engineers (1970)

The Judiciary Act of 1793 (ch. 22 of the Acts of the 2nd United States Congress, 2nd Session, 1 Stat. 333) is a United States federal statute, enacted on March 2, 1793. It established a number of regulations related to court procedures.

The Judiciary Act of 1789 had created, in addition to the Supreme Court authorised by the Constitution, two lower levels of courts. Federal district courts, each with a district judge, composed the lowest level. Their district boundaries generally matched state lines. Every federal district also fell within the circuit of one of the three second-level courts, the circuit courts. Two Supreme Court justices and one district judge composed each circuit court bench; they traveled to each district to hear cases twice a year, at locations and times specified by statute.

In 1792, Supreme Court justices and also the Attorney General, Edmund Randolph, had urged President George Washington to push for changes in this system; he included a call for some changes in his annual address to Congress that November, and a Senatorial committee put a bill forward in January 1793.

The first three sections of the 1793 act concerned the structure of the court system. The first section authorised circuit courts to function with only one Supreme Court justice. With some exceptions in outlying areas, Supreme Court justices continued to sit as circuit court judges, one per circuit, until the Judiciary Act of 1891 created the courts of appeals. Since courts with two judges (one Supreme Court justice, one district court judge) could cast tie votes, the second section stated rules for those. The third authorised and regulated special circuit court sessions for criminal cases, to be held at more convenient places or times than the statutory regular sessions offered.

The remaining five sections regulated a variety of court practices. Section 4, as requested by Washington, dealt with who could take bail payments. Section 5 made rules for writs of ne exeat and of injunction; the rules for injunctions, such as requiring notice to the target of the injunction, and barring federal injunctions from stopping state court activities, remain largely in effect to this day and are perhaps this bill's most lasting legacy. Section 6 authorised inter-district subpoenas, but these were not to require witnesses in civil cases to travel over 100 miles. Section 7 authorised courts to make their own rules; this codified existing practice, and was a reaction to a House amendment aimed at giving the Supreme Court rule-making authority over all the courts. Section 8 ordered that appraisals of property seized in execution of writs of fieri facias should follow the same rules as appraisals made for the relevant state courts.

In some cases, a reference to the "Judiciary Act of 1793" actually points to the Judiciary Act of 1789; for example, the 1789 Act, not the 1793 one, mentions writs of mandamus, critical to the decision in Marbury v Madison.
