= Clawson v. United States =

- Supreme Court of the United States

Argued January 5, 1885 Decided January 19, 1885
- Full case name: Clawson v. United States
- Citations: 113 U.S. 143 (more) 5 S. Ct. 393; 28 L. Ed. 957

Court membership
- Chief Justice Morrison Waite Associate Justices Samuel F. Miller · Stephen J. Field; Joseph P. Bradley · John M. Harlan; William B. Woods · Stanley Matthews; Horace Gray · Samuel Blatchford

Case opinion
- Majority: Harlan, joined by unanimous

Clawson v. United States, 113 U.S. 143 (1885), was a case regarding a Utah territorial statute which authorized an appeal by a defendant in a criminal action from a final judgment of conviction, which provides that an appeal shall stay execution upon filing with the clerk a certificate of a judge that in his opinion there is probable cause for the appeal, and further provides that after conviction, a defendant who has appealed may be admitted to bail as of right when the judgment is for the payment of a fine only, and as matter of discretion in other cases, does not confer upon a defendant convicted and sentenced to pay a fine and be imprisoned the right, after appeal and filing of certificate of probable cause, to be admitted to bail except within the discretion of the court.

== Background ==
The appellant, Rudger Clawson, having been found guilty by a jury in the District Court for the Third Judicial District of Utah, of the crimes of polygamy and unlawful cohabitation, charged in separate counts of the same indictment, was sentenced, on the conviction for polygamy, to pay a fine of $0 and to be imprisoned for the term of three years and six months, and, on the conviction for unlawful cohabitation, to pay a fine of $0 and be imprisoned six months. From the whole of the judgment an appeal was taken to the supreme court of the territory, and the judge before whom the trial was held, had given a certificate that in his opinion there was probable cause thereof. The appeal was perfected and the certificate was filed in the proper office.

The defendant thereupon applied to the court in which he was sentenced to be let to bail pending his appeal. The application was denied, the order reciting that

The court being of the opinion that the defendant ought not to be admitted to bail after conviction and sentence unless some extraordinary reason therefor is shown, and there being no sufficient reason shown in this case, it is ordered that the motion and application for bail be and the same is hereby denied, and the defendant be remanded to the custody of the United States marshal.

The accused then sued out an original writ of habeas corpus from the supreme court of the territory. In his petition therefor, he stated that he was then imprisoned and in the actual custody of the United States marshal for the territory at the penitentiary in the County of Salt Lake. He also averred that upon the denial of bail by the court in which he was tried, "he was remanded to the custody of said United States marshal, who from thenceforth has imprisoned and still imprisons him" under said order of commitment, which "is the sole and only cause and authority" for his "detention and imprisonment," that "his said imprisonment is illegal" in that "he has been and is able and now offers to give bail pending his appeal in such sum as the court may reasonably determine," and that "as a matter of right and in the sound exercise of a legal discretion, the petitioner is entitled to bail pending the hearing and determination of said appeal."

== Decision ==
The supreme court of the territory overruled the application for bail, and remanded the petitioner to the custody of the marshal. From that order the present appeal was prosecuted.

== See also ==
- List of United States Supreme Court cases, volume 113
