= Major Crimes Act =

1885 United States Federal law

United States Supreme Court cases
- United States v. Kagama, 118 U.S. 375 (1886); Seymour v. Superintendent of Washington State Penitentiary, 368 U.S. 351 (1962); Keeble v. United States, 412 U.S. 205 (1973); United States v. Antelope, 430 U.S. 641 (1977); United States v. Wheeler, 435 U.S. 313 (1978); United States v. John, 437 U.S. 634 (1978); McGirt v. Oklahoma, No. 18-9526, 591 U.S. ___ (2020); Sharp v. Murphy, No. 17-1107, 591 U.S. ___ (2020); Denezpi v. United States, No. 20-7622, 596 U.S. ___ (2022)

The Major Crimes Act of 1885 or (18 U.S.C. § 1153), enacted as section 9 of the Indian Appropriations Act, 1886, is a law passed by the United States Congress. The law places certain crimes under federal jurisdiction if they are committed by a Native American in Native territory. The law follows the 1817 General Crimes Act, which extended federal jurisdiction to crimes committed in Native territory but did not cover crimes committed by Native Americans against Native Americans. The Major Crimes Act therefore broadened federal jurisdiction in Native territory by extending it to some crimes committed by Native Americans against Native Americans. The Major Crimes Act was passed by Congress in response to the Supreme Court of the United States's ruling in Ex parte Crow Dog (109 U.S. 556 (1883)) that overturned the federal court conviction of Brule Lakota sub-chief Crow Dog for the murder of principal chief Spotted Tail on the Rosebud Indian Reservation.

The original law placed seven major crimes under federal jurisdiction (exclusive of state jurisdiction) if they were committed by a Native American in Native territory. Those crimes were:

- Murder
- Manslaughter
- Rape
- Assault with intent to kill
- Arson
- Burglary
- Larceny

The text of the act is as follows:

§ 9. That immediately upon and after the date of the passage of this act, all Indians committing against the person or property of another Indian or other person any of the following crimes, namely, murder, manslaughter, rape, assault with intent to kill, arson, burglary, and larceny, within any territory of the United States, and either within or without the Indian reservation, shall be subject therefor to the laws of said territory relating to said crimes, and shall be tried therefor in the same courts, and in the same manner, and shall be subject to the same penalties, as are all other persons charged with the commission of the said crimes respectively; and said courts are hereby given jurisdiction in all such cases; and all such Indians committing any of the above-described crimes against the person or property of another Indian or other person, within the boundaries of any State of the United States, and within the limits of any Indian reservation, shall be subject to the same laws, tried in the same courts, and in the same manner, and subject to the same penalties, as are all other persons committing any of the above crimes within the exclusive jurisdiction of the United States.

This list of crimes has since been updated to the following (as of Pub. L. 114-38):

- Murder
- Manslaughter
- Kidnapping
- Maiming
- A felony under chapter 109A (i.e. sexual abuse)
- Incest
- A felony assault under section 113 (e.g. assault with intent to commit murder or assault with a dangerous weapon)
- An assault against an individual who has not attained the age of 16 years
- Felony child abuse or neglect
- Arson
- Burglary
- Robbery
- A felony under section 661 of this title (i.e. larceny)

The constitutionality of the Major Crimes Act was upheld in United States v. Kagama (118 U.S. 375 (1886)), a case in which two Indians were prosecuted for killing another Indian on a reservation. While the Court agreed that the prosecution of major crimes did not fall within Congress's power to regulate commerce with the Indian tribes, it ruled that the trust relationship between the federal government and the tribes conferred on Congress both the duty and the power to regulate tribal affairs.

After the Major Crimes Act was passed, many tribes continued to prosecute Native Americans for major crimes, thus exercising jurisdiction concurrent with the federal courts. This practice was upheld by the Court of Appeals for the Ninth Circuit in the 1995 case Wetsit v. Stafne.

The Major Crimes Act was the focal point of the Supreme Court case McGirt v. Oklahoma, 591 U.S. 894 (2020), which found that nearly half of the state of Oklahoma had not been disestablished as a Native American reservation by Congress prior to Oklahoma's statehood and thus remained Indian country, such that crimes committed by enrolled tribal members cannot be tried in state court.

== See also ==
- Indian Country Jurisdiction
