= Circuit riding =

Practice of traveling between court locations

In the United States, circuit riding was the practice of a judge, sometimes referred to as a circuit rider, traveling to a judicial district to preside over court cases there. A defining feature of American federal courts for over a century after the founding of the United States, circuit riding has since been mostly abolished. The term, however, lives on in the name "circuit court", a colloquialism commonly used to refer to the United States courts of appeals.

== History ==
Shortly after the ratification of the United States Constitution in 1788, Congress passed the Judiciary Act of 1789, creating the U.S. circuit courts. These circuit courts did not have appointed judges; rather, two Supreme Court Justices and a local U.S. district court judge would preside over cases. This created the practice of circuit riding, wherein Supreme Court justices would travel to designated meeting places in their assigned circuit to hear cases. Circuit riding in the early United States was often an arduous process, requiring long travel on horseback or carriage over harsh terrain, months-long extended stays away from home, and difficulties in acquiring lodging (Congress did not provide accommodations).

Circuit riding temporarily ceased in 1801, when the Federalist majority in Congress established new circuit courts that were staffed with Federalist-appointed judges. The next year this reorganization was repealed, and circuit riding resumed under the original circuit court structure. In 1891, Congress passed the Judiciary Act of 1891, creating the United States courts of appeals, which assumed most of the routine functions of the circuit courts, significantly curtailing the need for circuit riding. The circuit courts continued to exist (in significantly reduced form) until January 1, 1912, when Congress abolished them under the Judicial Code of 1911, eliminating the practice of circuit riding.

== See also ==
- Assizes — a type of judicial courts, to which circuit riding often applied
- Itinerant court — older, similar concept for royalty and governments
- Circuit (administrative division)
