= History of United States patent law =

The history of United States patent law started even before the U.S. Constitution was adopted, with some state-specific patent laws. The history spans over more than three centuries.

== Background ==
The oldest form of a patent was seen in Medieval times. Medieval rulers would grant an exclusive right to a "monopoly." This was sometimes an attempt to raise funds without taxing, although taxes were still imposed. In England such grants took the form of "letters patent", issued by the sovereign to inventors who petitioned and were approved: a grant of 1331 to John Kempe and his company is the earliest authenticated instance of a royal grant made with the avowed purpose of instructing the English in a new industry.

In 1474, in Venice, the first known patent law that granted inventors exclusive rights to their inventions was passed as a result of an economic policy. Thereafter, patents were a formal means of granting and restricting monopolies in Europe. The Venice statute had all the basic elements of a modern patent system—a requirement of novelty, proof of usefulness, and a requirement that the patentee describe and explain the invention.

In 1624, in England, the Statute of Monopolies was passed primarily to restrict the power of the sovereign in granting monopolies. The Statute of Monopolies, for the first time in history, defined the following: that inventions had to be "new" to attain a monopoly, and that a monopoly would be granted only for a limited period of time (in this case 14 years.) These aspects have carried forward and helped shape the United States Patent Law. The Statute of Monopolies attempted to reinforce the advantages to society of new inventions; however, a French Patent Law, established in 1791, focused on the inventor and emphasized the invention as the inventor's property. The US Patent Law today adopts both streams of thought; however, the concept of monopolies and patents, in the US, initiated with the British thought of advantages to society.

== United States patent law ==
=== Patent practice before federal patent laws ===
==== Case-specific acts ====
In America in the early colonial period, there were no general laws providing for the issuing of patents. However, people who invented new products could appeal to the colonial governments, which could grant them the exclusive commercial right to the products. The earliest of such rights granted in the colonies was in the state of Massachusetts in 1641. The Massachusetts General Court gave Samuel Winslow an exclusive right to utilize a new process of making salt for 10 years. The case is unofficially known of as the first "patent" in America.

Other similar exclusive commercial rights were granted in other colonies and later states of the United States of America. These acts were all private acts of the colony or state governments to grant commercial privileges to specific people, before general laws regarding the issuing of patents were passed in each state. This custom of using private acts to grant patents is often said to have come from the early in England, particularly the English Statute of Monopolies of 1624.

==== State-level general patent laws ====
Near the end of the 18th century, states started to pass general patent laws replacing the case-specific acts. These state-level general acts set up standardized procedures for patent applications, an examination process, and general terms for patent holdings. The first state to pass a general patent law was South Carolina, in 1784.

This first general patent act of the state of South Carolina is titled "An Act for the Encouragement of Arts and Sciences." Although most of its terms concerned the protection of copyrights, it also included the following provision: "The Inventors of useful machines shall have a like exclusive privilege of making or vending their machines for the like term of 14 years, under the same privileges and restrictions hereby granted to, and imposed on, the authors of books."

Many other states followed suit in passing general patent acts, most using a 14-year term, resembling English practices. However, without a federal system, patentees who wanted to use their invention in more than one state had to apply separately for patents in each state, which was expensive and time-consuming. A standardized national patent law was needed for more efficient patent grating process.

=== United States federal patent laws ===
==== Constitution ====
The Constitution of the United States, first adopted on September 17, 1787, had a provision for protecting intellectual properties. The provision is found in Article I, Section 8:

"The Congress shall have Power ... To promote the Progress of Science and useful Arts, by securing for limited Times to Authors and Inventors the exclusive Right to their respective Writings and Discoveries."

==== Patent Act of 1790 ====
The Patent Act of 1790 was the first federal patent statute of the United States. It was titled "An Act to promote the Progress of Useful Arts." The statute was concise, including only seven sections. Similar to the state statutes, the federal statute allowed the patentees a 14-year term of exclusive right to use their inventions, without the possibility of an extension. This was unsatisfactory to many inventors who wanted extended protection time for their inventions. They argued that 14 years were not enough, given that it often took several years already for their inventions to be commercialized. Another important point of the Patent Act of 1790 was that it did not allow foreigners to obtain patents in the United States.

In the Patent Act of 1790, the power to grant or refuse patents was given exclusively to three people: the Secretary of State, the Secretary of War, and the Attorney General. Patent applicants needed the consent of at least two of the three officials to obtain a patent. The act provided that an examination process be carried out by the same three officials to decide whether the inventions were "not before known or used" and "sufficiently useful and important". This examination process was soon criticized as taking unreasonably too much time. At the same time, the people responsible for examining and granting patents had other important duties to attend to and could not carry out the process quickly. It took several months for a patent to be examined.

==== Patent Act of 1793 ====
In 1793, the 1790 act was repealed and replaced by the Patent Act of 1793. The act was notable for its definition of the subjects of patents which remains unchanged until now: "any new and useful art, machine, manufacture or composition of matter and any new and useful improvement on any art, machine, manufacture or composition of matter". In this later act, the patent application process was much simpler than in the Patent Act of 1790. People who sought patents only needed to petition the Secretary of State and then it was the duty of the Secretary of State to acquire examination from the Attorney General. The examination process was simplified by dropping the clause that patented inventions needed to be "sufficiently useful and important". It was enough that inventions were somehow useful, even if the usefulness was insignificant, and "not before known or used" to be granted patents.

Obtaining patents became much easier during the period after the Patent Act of 1793 and the next federal Patent Act passed in 1836. Between the Patent Act of 1790 and that of 1793, only 57 patents were granted, but by July 2, 1836, a total of 10,000 patents had been granted. This however, came at an expense of the quality of patents granted. Thomas Jefferson, who was Secretary of State at the time, realized the need to employ experts into the patent examination process. He hired personnel from the University of Pennsylvania to help with determining the novelty and usefulness of the inventions. When more and more patent applications came in, the patent office, which was still loosely organized, was unable to adequately examine every application. In his book "Science in the Federal Government: A History of Policies and Activities" Dupree commented: "The patent office languished, but inventors were ever more active." Patents were granted to objects and procedures which were not original inventions or not useful. As this ineffective situation went on, more lawsuits were filed over patent validity and infringement. Patentees were dissatisfied, and courts were overwhelmed with patent lawsuits.

Under the Patent Act of 1793, the United States barred foreign inventors from receiving patents at the same time as granting patents to Americans who had pirated technology from other countries. “America thus became, by national policy and legislative act, the world’s premier legal sanctuary for industrial pirates. Any American could bring a foreign innovation to the United States and commercialize the idea, all with total legal immunity.”

==== Patent Act of 1836 ====
Relatively few patents were issued in the early decades of the nation, not exceeding 1,000 per year until 1854.

In 1836, another federal Patent Act was passed to reform problems in the previous acts. The Patent Act of 1836 was significant in a number of ways. Firstly, the act created an official Patent Office, which was still a part of the Department of State, but no longer under the duties of the Secretary of State. It freed the Secretary of State from the enormous duty of granting patents, when he had many other significant tasks to tend to. Instead of the Secretary of State, the Commissioner of Patents chaired the Patent Office. This restructuring of the patent office allowed for more efficient process of patent applications. Secondly, the act prevented the applications of already patented inventions by requiring information on newly granted patents to be made publicly accessible at libraries throughout the country. Anyone could consult this information to check whether his or her invention was truly original before filing for a patent. This greatly improved the quality of patents granted. Thirdly, the act resolved a long-standing dissatisfaction on patent terms by allowing, for the first time, a possible extension of 7 years of protection in addition to the original 14-year term. With the permission of the Commissioner of Patent, upon appropriate reasons, patentees could appeal to have their protection extended. And lastly, it finally removed the US nationality and residency requirements, making it possible for foreigners to file for US patents.

On July 13, 1836, Patent Number 1 was granted. In 1836, The Patent Office also went back and renumbered all previous patents with a suffix "X". Prior to this, patents were listed by names and dates and not numbers. After the renumbering, the very first US Patent became Patent 1X. On December 15 of the same year, a fire demolished the Patent Office, and only 2,845 patents were recovered. This resulted in a law that required all patent applications to be submitted in doubles. This law for double copies of patent applications was dropped in 1870 when the Patent Office started printing.

==== Subsequent changes ====
In 1849, the Patent Office was transferred from the State Department to the Department of the Interior.

==== The Sherman Antitrust Act ====
The 1890 depression resulted in an unfavorable view of patents. The depression was marked by a strained economy in which patents were perceived as a method of promoting monopolies. This negative attitude towards patents led to the inception of the Sherman Antitrust Act. During the depression, many opposed patents, and this is depicted in the tendency of courts to invalidate patents. The conclusion of the depression also ended the negative attitudes towards patents; however, the Patent Law underwent opposition again in the Great Depression. This skepticism towards patents again returned after World War II in another period of economic depression.

In 1925, the Patent Office was transferred again from the Department of the Interior to the Department of Commerce, where it is today.

==== Modern patent laws ====
In 1952, the basic structure of the modern Patent Law was laid out with the Patent Act of 1952. In this amendment, an inventor had to describe not only his invention but also the basis for its infringement. Furthermore, an invention needed to be new and useful, as well as non- obvious to be granted a patent. This amendment, which required patents to be non-obvious, was implemented to keep individuals from taking ownership or taking away from the base pool of knowledge in a particular field.

In 1982, the Court of Customs and Patent Appeals was abolished, and patent appeal cases were transferred to the newly established Court of Appeals for the Federal Circuit. The Court of Appeals for the Federal Circuit assured the uniformity of the patent case law in the country.

In 2011, the Leahy–Smith America Invents Act (AIA) enacted the most significant change to the U.S. patent system since 1952. After decades of debate in the U.S. comparing and contrasting the pros and cons of "first-to-invent" versus "first-to-file" systems, the AIA switched the U.S. patent system from "first to invent" to "first inventor to file". The U.S. had been the last remaining country still using a first-to-invent system. The AIA reforms eliminate interference proceedings and develop post-grant opposition. Its central provisions went into effect March 16, 2013 for patent applications filed that day or afterwards.

== Terms of patents ==
The original patent term under the 1790 Patent Act was decided individually for each patent, but "not exceeding fourteen years". The 1836 Patent Act (5 Stat. 117, 119, 5) provided (in addition to the fourteen-year term) an extension "for the term of seven years from and after the expiration of the first term" in certain circumstances. In 1861 the seven-year extension was eliminated and the term changed to seventeen years (12 Stat. 246, 249, 16) (from grant date). The signing of the 1994 Uruguay Round Agreements Act then changed the patent term from seventeen years from the date of issue to the current twenty years from the earliest filing date.

Year	Validity [Years]
–1789	–
1790–1835	14
1836–1860	21
1861–1994	17 (from grant date)
1995–	20 (from filing date)

== Other notable dates ==
The first U.S. patent, issued to Samuel Hopkins on July 31, 1790, for an innovative way of making "pot ash and pearl ash"

- 1790 – First US Patent Act drafted in the US Constitution. The first US Patent, numbered X000001 (pictured right), was granted on July 31, 1790. The patent was granted by President George Washington. The patent was granted to Samuel Hopkins, in Pittsford, Vermont, for the "making of pot ash and pearl ash by a new apparatus and process".
- 1800 – Law prohibited foreigners to apply for patents in the US, unless they had been residents for 2 years.
- 1829 – Pennock v. Dialogue: This trial resulted in the statutory bar that patents could not be granted to inventions that were already in public use.
- 1832 –
  - All resident aliens with an intent to become US citizens were allowed to apply for patents; however, they had to use their patent within one year in the US.
  - Patents were also allowed to be changed if they had errors.
  - In Grant v. Raymond it was ruled that an insufficient description of a patent was grounds for defense in cases of patent infringement.
- 1836 – On July 13, Patent Number 1 was granted. All old patents were relisted with X's, and the first patent became Patent 1X.
- 1836 – Patent Office 1836 fire
- 1839 – Patent Law was amended to provide a grace period of two years to use the patent. Patents that were rejected by the Patent Office could appeal to the Chief Justice in D.C.
- 1842 – Fabrics were allowed to be patented. Hotchkiss v. Greenwood: Patents were furthered to also be "non-obvious" besides new and useful.
- 1861 – Patent Law was amended, with some important amendments including:
  - Three chief examiners were nominated to hear patent applications that had been rejected more than twice.
  - Utility patents were now granted for 17 years.
  - Design patents could be granted for 3½-, 7-, or 14-year periods upon the request of the applicant.
- 1870 – All legislations regarding patents were framed under one Act. Approximately 105,000 patents were in place.
- 1871 – Patent applications had to include black and white drawings of a particular size.
- 1883 – The Paris Convention (ParC) was signed, allowing patents to be valid among member countries.
- 1887 – The US joined the Paris Convention.
- 1893 – Patent appeals were heard in Court of Appeal for the District of Columbia.
- 1897 – Statutory bars were changed: An application had to be filed in the US within seven months of receiving an International Patent to be valid in the US. Prior knowledge of an invention was only valid if the knowledge came from the US.
- 1911 – Approximately one million patents had been granted.
- 1939 – Two-year grace period for using patents, was reduced to one year.
- 1941 – Cuno Engineering v. Automatic Devices Corp: Supreme Court ruled, that a patent must show Flash of genius. This will be changed later into a statutory non-obviousness requirement.
- 1946 – In order to receive a patent one had to be the "first to invent," in the world. This was amended to "first to invent" within the US. (Storage Battery v. Shimadzu)
- 1954 – Plant Patent Act amended to include seeds, mutants and hybrids.
- 1968 – Patent Cooperation Treaty (PCT) is signed.
- 1975 – Patent Office renamed "The Patent and Trademark Office."
- 1978 – European Patent Office (EPO) was opened.
- 1980 –
  - Patent fees had to be paid for keeping a patent.
  - Supreme Court valiadates a patent for genetically engineered bacteria.
  - Bayh–Dole Act premits the ownership of inventions arising from federal government-funded research.
- 1981 – Diamond v. Diehr Supreme Court restricted patentability of software algorithms. Merely using a computer does not make an invention non-eligible, however "insignificant postsolution activity will not transform an unpatentable principle into a patentable process″
- 1990 – The definition of patent infringement changed. Petr Taborsky is the first person to be found guilty in a US court of stealing intellectual property.
- 1995 –
  - United States Patent and Trademark Office (USPTO) opened patent museum.
  - Uruguay Round Agreements Act adopted into order to bring fulfill treaty obligations under the TRIPS agreement of the Uruguay Round. Among other changes, the length of a patent was changed from 17 years after being granted to 20 years after application.
- 1998 – State Street Bank v. Signature Financial: Federal Circuit rules an eligible invention must produce "a useful, concrete and tangible result.".
- 2001 – First official publication of US Patent Application. (because of the 1999 American Inventors Protection Act)
- 2008 – In re Bilski, Federal Circuit invention must "transform an article to a different state or thing″, State Street test not to be relied upon
- 2009 – Bilski v. Kappos, Supreme Court, holding that the machine-or-transformation test is not the sole test for determining the patent eligibility of a process
- 2011 – Leahy–Smith America Invents Act is signed into law
- 2014 – Alice Corp. v. CLS Bank International restricts patenting of abstract ideas, making software harder to patent.

== Trivia ==
The only President of the United States to hold a patent was Abraham Lincoln for a "device to buoy vessels over shoals"; it consisted of a set of retractable floats mounted on the sides of riverboats.

== See also ==
- Invention Secrecy Act
- Patent models, working demonstration models required by the U.S. Congress along with patent applications, up to 1870
- U.S. Patent No. 1, a board game about getting the first patent

== Bibliography ==
- Bellis, Mary. "The 212th Anniversary of the First American Patent Act". 2008. About.com: Inventors. Ed. The New York Times Company. (2008).
- Friedman, Lawrence M. American Law in the 20th Century. New Haven and London: Yale University Press, 2002.
- Lieberman, Jethro K. The Evolving Constitution. How the Supreme Court Has Ruled on Issues from Adoption to Zoning. First Edition ed. New York: Random House, Inc, 1992.
- LLP, Ladas & Parry. "A Brief History of the Patent Law of the United States". New York, 1999. Web Page. .
- Muir, Ian, Matthias Brandi-Dohrn, and Stephan Gruber. European Patent Law : Law and Procedure under the Epc and Pct. Oxford; New York: Oxford University Press, 1999.
- Robert B. Matchette et al. "Records of the Patent and Trademark Office". Maryland, 1995. The National Archives. Ed. US National Archives and Records Administration. website. National Archives.
- "Welcome to the Uspto Museum". Washington DC, 2006. United States Patent and Trademark Offices. Ed. USPTO. (7/27/2006): USPTO.
