= Samuel Morey =

American inventor (1762–1843)

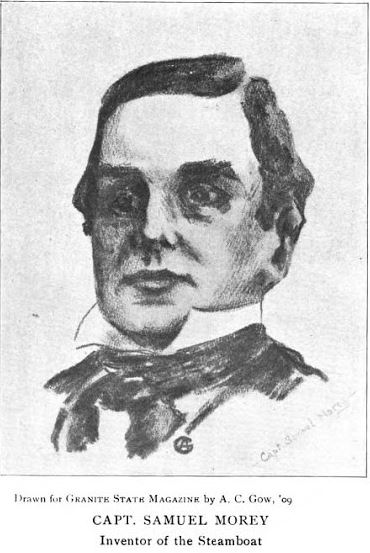
- 1909 illustration by A. C. Gow which appeared as the frontispiece in a 1915 biography
- Born: October 23, 1762; Hebron, Connecticut Colony, British America
- Died: April 17, 1843 (aged 80); Fairlee, Vermont, U.S.
- Resting place: West Cemetery, Orford, New Hampshire
- Occupations: Businessman; Inventor
- Engineering career
- Significant advance: Heated-surface carburetor Ethanol internal combustion engine Steamboat design and construction

Samuel Morey (October 23, 1762 – April 17, 1843) was an American inventor, who worked on early internal combustion engines and was a pioneer in steamships who accumulated a total of 20 patents.

== Early life ==
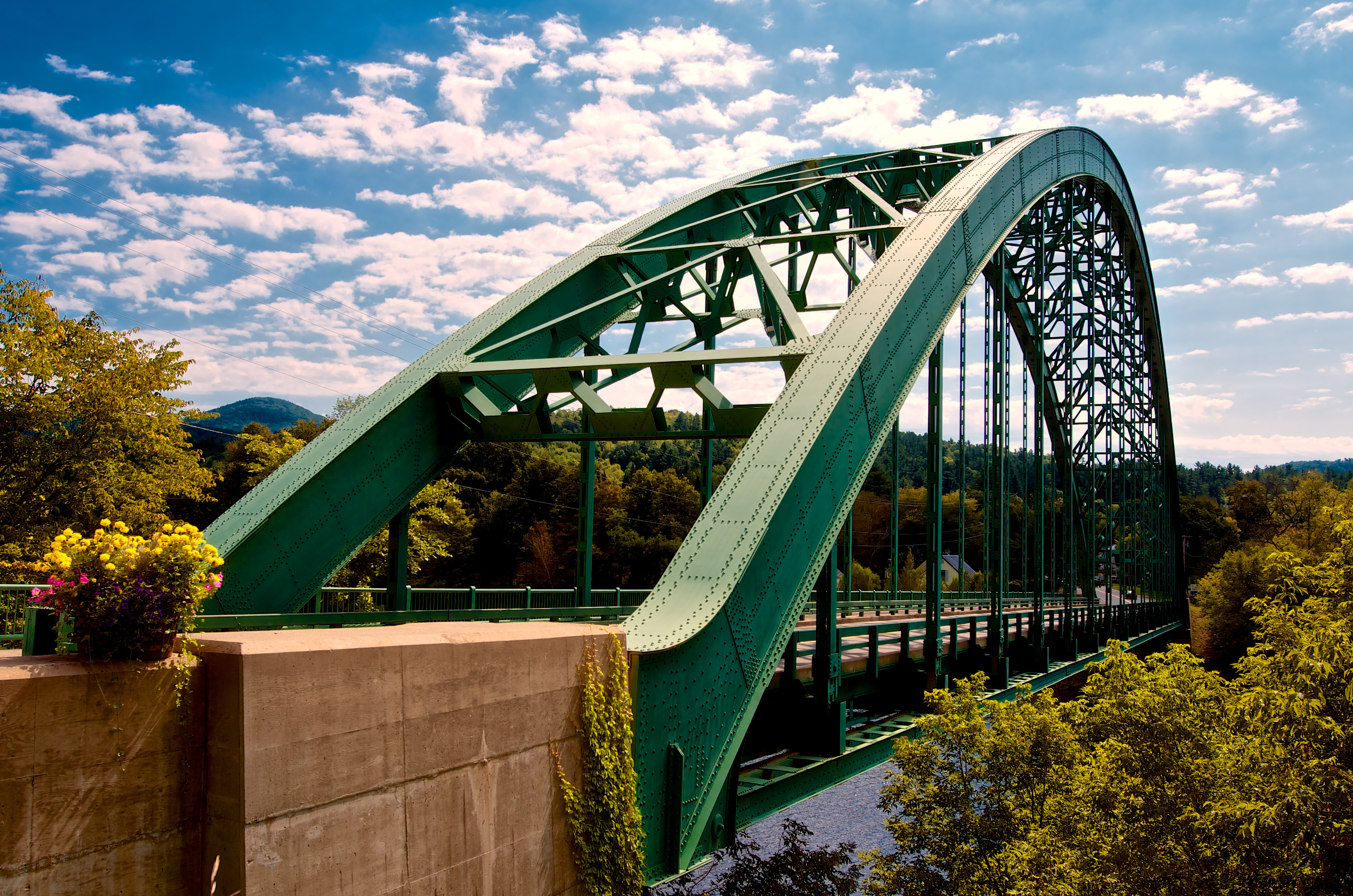
The Samuel Morey Memorial Bridge in Orford, NH

The son of a Revolutionary War Officer, he was the second of seven children born to Israel Morey (1735–1809) and Martha Palmer (1733–1810) and was born in Hebron, Connecticut, but moved to Orford, New Hampshire, with his family in 1768. His father Israel Morey served in the colonial militia and rapidly rose from private to general. Samuel Morey operated a successful lumber business in Orford and Fairlee, Vermont. He died in 1843, and was buried in Orford. Lake Morey in Vermont is named in his honor.

== Steam work ==
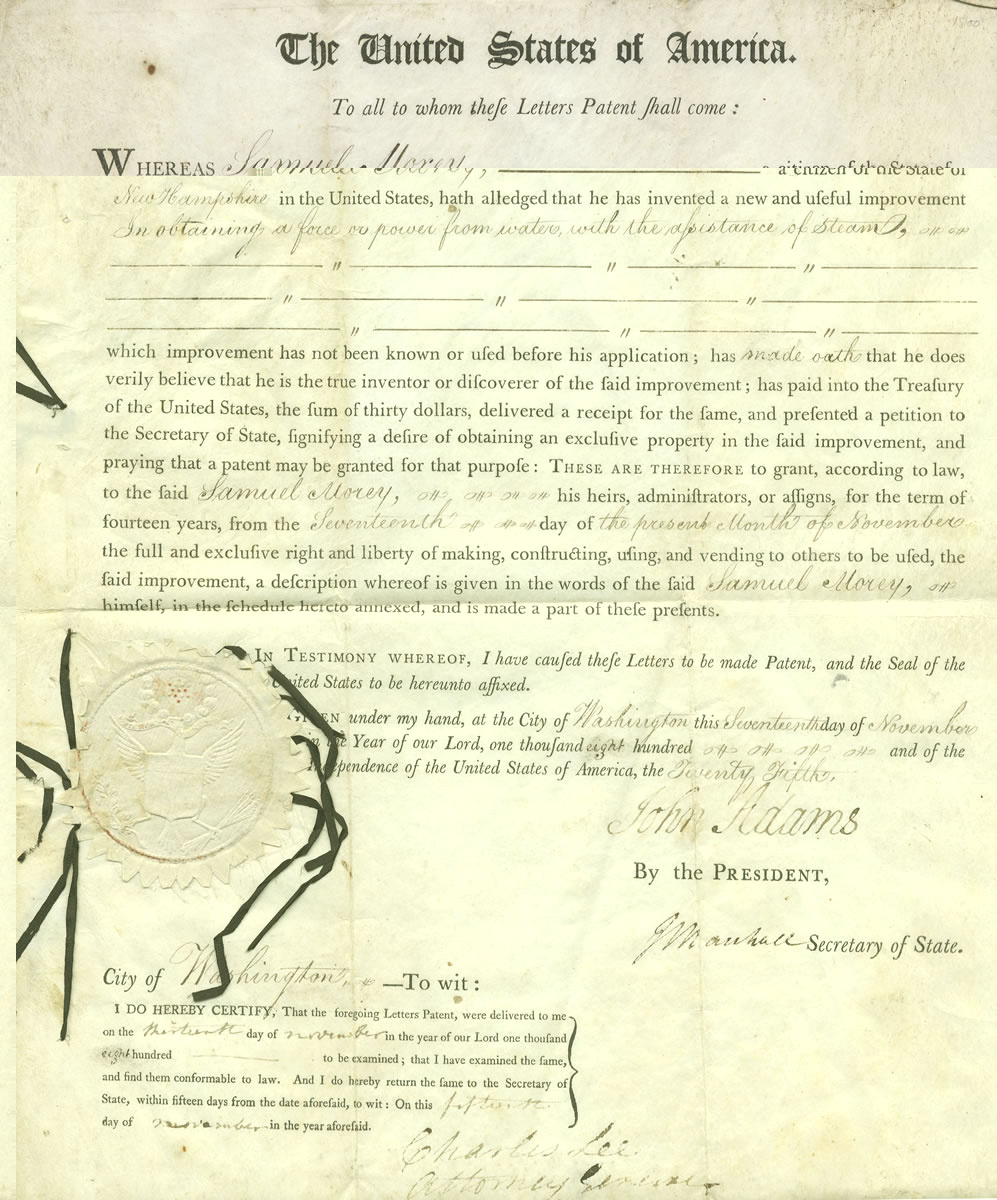
US Patent X306 (Force from Water with Assist of Steam) issued in November 1800

Morey's first patent, in 1793, was for a steam-powered spit, but he had grander plans. Morey realized that steam could be a power source in the 1780s, and he probably appreciated a steamboat's potential from work on his father's ferry and the locks he designed along the Connecticut river. In the early 1790s he fitted a paddle wheel and steam engine to a small boat and powered it up and down the Connecticut River. Legend has it, this was done on a Sunday morning, when the town was at church, to avoid ridicule if he failed.

The most important aspect of this craft was the paddle wheel. It was an old idea – supposedly dating to antiquities – and previously tried with a steam engine. Jonathan Hulls of England used a rear-mounted paddle wheel in 1737 but an inefficient method of turning the steam engine's reciprocating motion into the circular motion hobbled it. In 1789, Nathan Reed of Massachusetts experimented with a paddle wheel, and considered patenting it, but eventually patented a different method instead. The American John Fitch experimented with side-mounted paddle wheels, but in 1791 used and patented oars instead. Morey's may have been the first successful use of a steam power paddle wheel, which was the best method of propulsion until the propeller, invented by Fitch, was perfected.

A Road Marker in Vermont is inscribed with his accomplishment, "Samuel Morey, resident of Orford (New Hampshire) and later Fairlee (Vermont), successfully operated a steamboat on the Conn. River in 1793. Making over 4000 experiments, this early scientist patented an internal combustion engine in 1826 to anticipate the age of the motor car and airplane."

Morey's first boat was little more than a proof of concept, so he built another in New York. In a letter to New York legislator William Duer, Morey describes how over the next three summers he traveled down to New York, and the following summer to Hartford, Connecticut to improve and exhibit his boat. Finally, in 1797 he went to Bordentown, New Jersey (a stop on Fitch's failed Philadelphia-to-Trenton passenger service), because it was “sickly in New York”, and built a boat employing two side-mounted paddle wheels. At this point, Morey considered his boat ready for commercial use and sought financial backers. For reasons that are unclear, his backing fell through because of “a series of misfortunes”. This is likely the end of Morey's direct work with steamboats – although there are many tales of a later fourth steamboat– but not the end of his steam engine patents. In addition to one received in 1795 for improvements he made working on the steam engine in boat, he received patents for other applications and improvements in 1799, 1800, and 1803.

Despite Morey's success in building a working steamboat, credit for the first successful steamboat line goes to Robert Fulton and his financier, Chancellor Robert Livingston. This was a cause for contention, as Morey claims that they took some of his ideas. His account, which seems more reasonable than later, derived accounts, is laid out in his letter to Duer and is as follows. The summer after the one Morey spent at Hartford, he returned to New York and gave Livingston a ride in his boat (perhaps at the advice of Benjamin Silliman – publisher of Morey's papers – who knew Livingston to be a supporter of the arts). He was impressed and offered Morey a “considerable sum” if he could improve the boat's speed to 8 miles per hour. He also offered $7,000 for the rights to use his current work around New York but Morey declined the offer. However, he continued working towards Livingston's speed goal. Morey had conversations with Fulton and Livingston, and Livingston even traveled to Orford to see him (although Morey doesn't say when or what was discussed). Later, Morey reportedly was aboard Fulton's boat and expressed to Fulton his displeasure that his ideas had netted Fulton much but nothing for himself.

In 1815, Morey patented a “revolving” steam engine, described at length in the American Journal of Science in 1819 by John Sullivan, its purchaser. With the exception of one harsh initial review predicting that it would barely work – which was rebuffed by Sullivan, it was apparently well received and Sullivan's description appeared in the Edinburgh Philosophical Journal along with an introduction praising American steam engine and boat refinements. Instead of a stationary cylinder driving a rod that turns a wheel through a second linkage, it seems that the cylinder is allowed to pivot as the rod moves, which then turns a crank. The cylinder's pivot doubles as a valve that controls the direction and flow of steam according to its position. The claimed advantages of this configuration are lightweight, high-speed operation, durable construction, and low cost. This engine met with some commercial success; recorded applications include tugboats, a glass factory, and a sawmill in the Boston naval yard. One tugboat even sailed to South Carolina, where its owner was pleased by its performance. Morey received one more steam patent in 1817 but his interest had been captured by experiments with flammable vapors, which had started some time before.

== Experiments with vapors and combustion ==
In an 1834 letter to Silliman, Morey wrote: “It is now more than twenty years since I have been in the constant, I may say daily practice of making experiments on the decomposition of water, by mixing with its vapor that of spirits of turpentine, and a great portion of atmospheric air.” This would seem to understate the scope of some research that led to such diverse discoveries as the liquid fueled internal combustion engine, a method for carbonating water, and odd bubbles formed by molten resin. The last two appeared in journals in England and Germany, respectively. Morey noted differences in flames near knots, perhaps rich in sap, or in wet wood. Eventually he experimented with anything he could find: “tar, rosin, rough turpentine, or the spirit, or alcohol, or any kind of oil, fat, or tallow; mineral coal, pitch-pine wood, and the knots, birch bark, pumpkin, sun-flower, flax, and other seeds; as well as many other substances.”

His experiments are described at length over several articles in the American Journal of Science and Arts. They are light on theory, and Silliman comments that “[Morey's] results are often very valuable, and perhaps, in some cases, not the less so, for having been sought without the direction of preconceived, theoretical views.” This is mostly true; theory enters into these articles mostly for possible explanations. However, in 1834, 15 years after his first publication on the subject, he proposes a theory of combustion that has electricity as its basic force. Hints of this theory may be visible in his first paper, but his early experiments were not guided by it.

His first practical application was to heat water for his revolving engine. He observed that passing steam over burning coal or tar caused the flames to burn brighter and without smoke, and he theorized that the steam was decomposed in this process. Word of these experiments reached the eminent French chemist Gay-Lussac, and he commented on them in Annales de Chimie et de Physique in 1819. He contended that the temperature was insufficient to cause decomposition. Instead, the steam freed more flammable vapors in the fuel causing the flame's change. Morey was correct. He produced what is now known as town gas. The oxygen from the water combines with carbon from the fuel to form carbon monoxide and the hydrogen forms a diatomic molecule. Both later burn to form water and carbon dioxide. Morey was not the first to use water-gas for lighting, and his devices, including the patented 1818 American Water Burner, simply used the gas immediately instead of piping it to be burnt elsewhere, done as early as 1792 in England. Morey apparently did not know of this advance or at least did not recognize it as the same process. Strangely, in 1819 J. F. Dana of Dartmouth and Harvard proposed attaching steam boilers to street lamps to take advantage of Morey's discovery, but water-gas was already being piped to some London street lamps from a central source in 1812. Still, Morey's device did produce more light, and there is evidence that it resulted in more efficient combustion.

== Internal combustion work ==
During his experiments, Morey discovered that the vapor of turpentine, when mixed with air, was explosive. He recognized its potential, developed an engine, and wrote an unpublished description in 1824, which he modified in 1825 and 1826. He finally published and patented the idea later in that year. The revisions between the drafts are small, and deal mostly with reworking of the engine's valves.

The engine has much in common with modern ones. It has two cylinders, a carburetor, a familiar arrangement of valves and cams. However, unlike modern engines, and unlike the earlier 1807 François Isaac de Rivaz engine, the explosion did not directly provide power. Instead, the explosion expelled air from the cylinder through a one-way valve. The cylinder was cooled by a water jacket and water injected into the combustion chamber after it fired. The cooling gasses caused a vacuum and atmospheric pressure drove the piston. Morey did mention trying direct action, and elaborated on it in other descriptions. However, his method was more complicated and possibly less efficient because it used more of the engine's stroke to draw in fuel.

Morey demonstrated his engine in New York and Philadelphia and there are eyewitness reports for both. In Philadelphia, he demonstrated it powering a boat and a wagon. Unfortunately, when he decided to demonstrate the car on the street, he fell off after starting the engine and the vehicle powered across Market Street into a ditch. This was the second car ride in the world, and the first in the United States. Despite these mostly successful demonstrations, Morey could not find a buyer, and became frustrated. A letter from Reverend Dana of Orford written in October 1829 tells of Morey's trip to Baltimore, “I am told, the Capt. is determined to make one more vigorous effort, to sell his patent right for some of his modern inventions [he later singles out the vapor engine], and if he does not now succeed, he will give the matter up, and return to Orford, to spend his days in quiet.” Morey did not find a buyer, and as he was then in his late 60s, it made sense to stop traveling up and down the east coast and call it quits.

While the engine was state of the art, it was not novel in many respects. Morey seemed aware of contemporary internal combustion work – Hardenberg, who wrote a book on Morey's engine, adeptly noted that in his 1825 draft Morey “stated that he named his invention ‘vapor engine, to distinguish it from the… gas engine.’” However, Hardenberg concludes that Morey could only have known of three engines similar to his. He never mentioned them, and Hardenberg concludes that they did not influence Morey. His internal combustion engine is the first documented in the United States, and his use of liquid fuel and a heated surface carburetor was world's first. Another interesting feature was the wire mesh used to prevent the combustion from reaching the carburetor. This feature was reinvented and patented again in 1872 because the patent office had lost Morey’s patent in the 1836 patent office fire. The lack of interest in his vapor engine is unfortunate, because the vapor engine was his most farsighted invention. Morey notes in his unpublished 1824 draft that:

Is there not some reason to expect that the discovery will greatly change the commercial and personal intercourse of the country. There is good reason I trust to conclude that transportation on good roads or railroad may be done much cheaper as well as quicker than by locks and canals, besides having the great advantage of being done, much of it, in the winter a time much the most convenient of the farmer. In their personal intercourse, if it should be generally thought most prudent to continue their intercourse on the earth’s surface, yet I think there will be little use of horses for that purpose.

— Samuel Morey, unpublished

He mentions "the earth's surface" because elsewhere he proposed using the engine to propel balloons. Now that the internal combustion engine's potential has been realized, people often focus on his engine. The first push to popularize his work was done by Charles Duryea, a fellow inventor who produced the first gasoline-powered automobile in America in 1893. He funded the creation of two working replicas of Morey's Engine — one is in the possession of the Smithsonian and the other is owned by Dean Kamen — and posited that Morey's engine was a direct precursor of the modern engine, a position with which others disagree. Recently, Morey's work has received renewed attention by people other than locals and engineers, in particular American comedian Jay Leno, who is an avid car collector.

== Writing ==
Messrs. Rush and Muhlenburg: Dear Sir: — Perhaps I ought to have written sooner, but with all my exertions, and they have been as important as they ever were with you, I could not perfect, to my mind, the application of the "new power" to a boat until within two weeks. It will now run as regular as any that are driven with steam, and with very little expense. The boat is about nine teen feet long, 5 \ wide and the engine occupies only about eighteen inches of the stern, and sometimes goes between 7 and 8 miles per hour. The same engine may unquestionably, when in better hands, be made to drive one, properly constructed, of twice the capacity, at least ten. Its application to stationary purposes I perfected last winter. Throughout the whole time I have been constantly perfecting the engine. I expect to leave here in two or three days for home to arrange my business for winter, and if possible to collect some money for you and Mr. Garrett, as well as some for myself, which I could do were there any in the country, as I have more than $3,000 of salable personal property and good debts. But whether I get any or not, you may expect to see me next month, if I am alive and well as usual. I have the engine already packed up to be put with the mails on board a Packet, as soon as I can get ready to start from home. Have been inclined to think I should send it to Baltimore in the first instance, but shall postpone entirely anything further. When I have the pleasure to see you I hope to learn what will be the best course to be taken. It remains for me to have the engine applied to a carriage on a rail, road, and when that is done, I should think I have done my part. I can but hope and trust the ensuing winter will see the engine well applied to a carriage on a railroad. With sentiments of the greatest esteem and friendship, I am dear Sirs, as ever, Yours, SAM' MOREY. Sept., 1829.

Captain Samuel Morey, a native of Connecticut, but a resident of Oxford, N. H., began his experiments in 1790, and that year propelled his boat by a stern wheel, from Hartford to New York City, at the rate of five miles an hour. On her return trip from New York to Greenwich, Conn., she had as passengers Chancellor Livingston, Edward Livingston, John Stevens, of Hoboken, N. J., and others; this was the sixth boat built in the United States. In a letter written to William A. Duer, Esq., some years later, Captain Morey says : " As nearly as I can recollect, it was as early as 1790 that I turned my attention to improving the steam engine and in applying it to the purpose of propelling boats. In June, 1797, I went to Bordentown, on the Delaware, and there constructed a steamboat and devised the plan of propelling by means of wheels on the side. The shafts ran across the boat with a crank in the middle worked from the beam of the engine with a shackle-bar. The boat was only exhibited in Philadelphia. I took out patents for my improvements. 1 never had any doubt but that I had a right to take out a patent for the application of two wheels to a steamboat, and often told Mr. Fulton and Mr. Livingston that I had. To the latter I once asserted this right when on board his steamboat with him." Morey, like his predecessors, was prevented from continuing his experiments for lack of means.

Letter not found. 5 September 1802. Acknowledged in Daniel Brent to Morey, 9 Oct. 1802 (DNA: RG 59, DL, vol. 14). Brent informed Morey that his letter had arrived in JM’s absence “and I have just received his directions, since his return, to forward the enclosed exemplification of the Patent alluded to, to you, and to return you fifty cents, and I herewith do so.” Samuel Morey (1762–1843) was an inventor who held a number of patents, including a steam-operated spit (1793), a windmill (1796), a steam pump (1799), and the internal combustion engine (1826). He began steamboat experiments in 1790 and was awarded a patent in 1803 for improvements on a steam engine.

== Patent "discovery" ==
In 2004, 10 of Morey's patents, including the one for the internal combustion engine, were rediscovered in the Dartmouth College archives.

Morey holds the earliest patent for an internal-combustion engine. Other patents include a steam-powered rotisserie.

== Honors ==
- Samuel Morey Elementary School

== Articles by Samuel Morey ==
- "On preserving Indian Corn from frost", Memoirs of the Philadelphia Society for Promoting Agriculture, Volume 4
- "On a new revolving steam engine", Edinburgh Philosophical Journal 1 (1819): pp. 348–352 (also in American Journal of Science 1818)
- "On the Revolving Steam Engine" of SAMUEL MOREY. J. L. SULLIVAN. American Journal of Science and Arts, 4, 57, (1819).
- "On the Revolving Steam Engine". ISAAC DOOLITTLE. American Journal of Science and Arts, 2, 101, (1820).
- "On A New Means of Producing Heat and Light". SULLIVAN. American Journal Of Science and Arts, 1, 91 (1819).
- "On heat and light", American Journal of Science and Arts 2 (1820): pp. 118–132.
- "On Heat and Light". MOREY. American Journal of Science and Arts, 2, 118, 122 (1820).
- "Bubbles blown in Melted Rosin." MOREY. American Journal of Science and Arts, 2, 179 (1820).
- "On artificial mineral waters, with some remarks on artificial light", American Journal of Science and Arts 3 (1821): pp. 94–102.
- "On Fetid Crystallized Limestone". MOREY. American Journal of Science and Arts, 3, 324 (1821).
- "Remarks on the patent Water-Burner". American Journal of Science and Arts 7 (1824): pp. 141–145.
- "An account of a new explosive engine, generating a power that may be substituted for that of the steam engine". American Journal of Science and Arts 11 (1826): pp. 104–110.
- "An Account of a New Explosive Engine", generating a Power that may be Substituted for that of the Steam Engine. MOREY. American Journal of Science and Arts, r I, 104 (1826). Journal Of the Franklin Institute, 2, 115 (1826).
- "Observations on combustion and the powers concerned in that process", American Journal of Science and Arts 25 (1834): pp. 146–151.

== Recovered X-patents ==
- X51 Turning A Spit
- X246 New And Invented Water Engine
- X306 Force From Water With Assist Of Steam
- X2,339 Steam Engine Granted July 14, 1815
- X2,752 Tide And Current Water Wheel For Driving Mills Or Machinery With Or Without A Dam
- X2,880 Method Of Burning Water Called The American Water Burner
- X3,060 Shooting With Steam And Gas
- X4,378 Gas Or Vapor Engine
- X7,826 Decomposing And Recomposing Water In Combo With Spirits Of Turpentine

Patents continued:

- 95X Improvement in Applying Steam
- 107X Raising Water by Wind
- 244X Obtaining force from water by steam
- 462X Steam Engine Samuel Morey, Rufus Graces, Richard Giles
- 1740X Power from difference between rarefied and unrarefied air Mode of obtaining power between the difference of a column of rarified and unrarified air. Samuel Morey, Philadelphia, PA
- 1867X Fireplace and chimney for saving fuel
- 2753X Boiler for steam engines
- 3042X Treble pipe steam boiler
- 3043X Improvement on the American water burner

== See also ==
- 1877 U. S. Patent Office fire
- 1836 U.S. Patent Office fire
- History of the internal combustion engine
- Horst O. Hardenberg, "The Middle Ages of the I.C. Engine" (Warrendale, 1999) pages 115-132.
- Samuel Morey papers, 1793 - 1860, Dartmouth Library

== Sources ==
- Capt. Samuel Morey who Built a Steamboat Fourteen Years Before Fulton by Gabriel Farrell, 1915
- Who invented the American Steamboat? A Statement of the Evidence that the First American Steamboat, Propelled by Means of Paddle Wheels, was Invented, Constructed, and Successfully Operated on Connecticut River, about 1792, by Captain Samuel Morey, of Orford, N.H., and that Robert Fulton Saw the Boat in Operation by the Antiquarian Society, 1874
- Samuel Morey: The Edison of His Day by George Carter, The Rumford Press, 1945.
- Frederick H. Getman, "Samuel Morey, a Pioneer of Science in America", Osiris 1 (Jan., 1936): 278–302.
- "American Water Burner", The American Monthly Magazine and Critical Review (1819), Volumes 3–4, p. 310.
