= United States Patent Office fire =

United States Patent Office Fire may refer to:

- 1836 U.S. Patent Office fire
- 1877 U.S. Patent Office fire
