= Patent Act of 1790 =

First U.S. federal legislation on patent

- Long title: An Act to promote the progress of useful Arts
- Enacted by: the 1st United States Congress
- Effective: April 10, 1790

Citations
- Statutes at Large: 1 Stat. 109

Legislative history
- Signed into law by President George Washington on April 10, 1790

The Patent Act of 1790 (1 Stat. 109) was the first patent statute passed by the federal government of the United States. It was enacted on April 10, 1790, about one year after the constitution was ratified and a new government was organized. The law was concise, defining the subject matter of a U.S. patent as "any useful art, manufacture, engine, machine, or device, or any improvement there on not before known or used." It granted the applicant the "sole and exclusive right and liberty of making, constructing, using and vending to others to be used" of his invention.

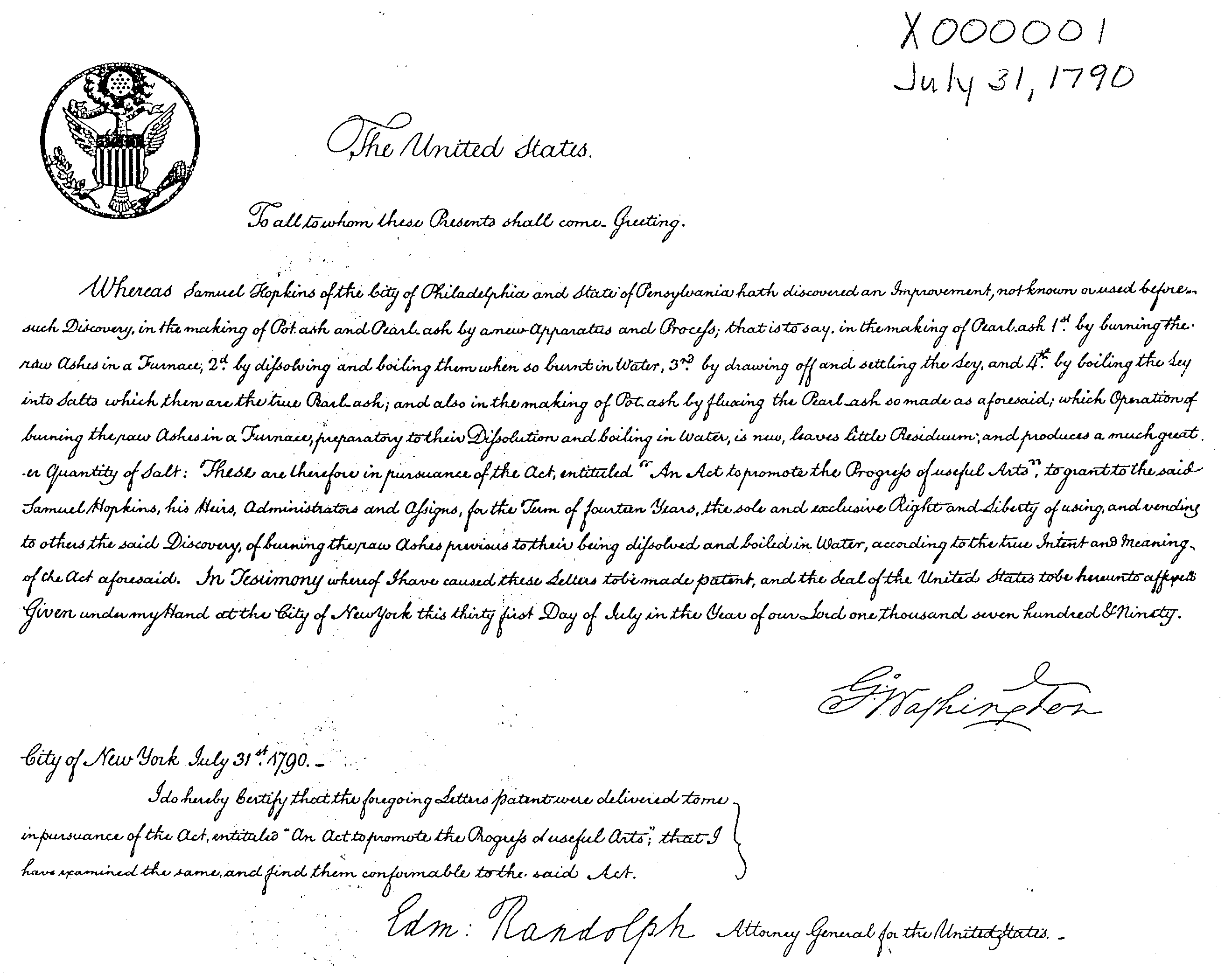
United States Patent X1

== Background ==
The origins of the 1790 Patent Act can be found in House Resolution 41, which brought about a discussion concerning the constitutionality of authorizing patents of importation. House Resolution 41 is the reason for why the Patent Act of 1790 did not provide for patents of importation when it was finally passed. Patent Board members, who also called themselves the "Commissioners for the Promotion of Useful Arts", were given the authority to grant or refuse a patent after deciding if the invention or discovery was "sufficiently useful and important." The first board members included Thomas Jefferson, Henry Knox, and Edmund Randolph. Obtaining a patent required an overall fee of about four to five dollars：filing the application cost fifty cents plus ten cents per hundred words of specification: two dollars for producing the actual patent, one dollar for affixing the Great Seal and twenty cents for endorsement and all other services. The duration of each patent was assigned by the Patent Board, and could be of any length as long as it did not exceed fourteen years.

== Operation of the act ==
The authority to grant and refuse patents was handled completely by the Patent Board, which was composed of three members: the Secretary of State, the Secretary of War, and the Attorney General. The Department of State was where the act was administered because that is where the necessary books and records were kept and where filed papers were received. The three members of the Patent Board held meetings every so often and discussed the patent applications they had received. Sometimes the Patent Board would designate a day, during which a hearing would be held and the patent petitioner would have an opportunity to explain her or his case in person. However, these meetings were not scheduled as regularly as could have been, and the process for reviewing applications advanced slowly as each application required thorough and careful inspection.

== Obtaining a patent ==
The act was intended to grant patents only to the "useful Arts," which was usually the work of skilled workers and artisans, especially in the fields of engineering and manufacturing. Obtaining a patent required first completing an examination, but this examination requirement was later dropped with the passing of the Patent Act of 1793. The inventor was required to submit "a specification...containing a description...not only distinguish[ing] the invention...but also to enable" a person knowledgeable of the art to use the invention for its intended purpose. This specification was made in writing and included a drawing and model if possible. Applicants were not required to give an oath.

== Infringement ==
Cases of infringement were dealt with by a jury, which assessed the damages made and appropriate punishment. The person who infringed, if found guilty, was made to hand over all of the infringing devices to the owner of the patent. Patents could be repealed by a district court within one year after it was granted if found to be infringing. However, if one was to bring her or his case to trial and lose, she or he would have to pay all costs. Several infringement suits involving the patents granted under this act occurred between 1790 and 1793, which are detailed by an act passed on June 7, 1974. In the event that a patent was found to be unjustly repealed, all suits, actions, processes and proceedings under the act of 1790 that had been set aside, suspended or abated by original reason for why it should be repealed could be given back as if the act had not been repealed.

== Patents passed under the act ==
Fifty-seven patents were granted during the three years the 1790 Patent Act existed. Three of these patents were granted in 1790, thirty-three in 1791, eleven in 1792, and ten in 1793 before February, which is when the following patent act was adopted. There is little available information regarding the subject matter of these patents, because all of these records along with other documents of the Patent Office were destroyed in the Patent Office Fire of 1836. The first patent was granted on July 31, 1790, to Samuel Hopkins for his invention of "Making Pot and Pearl Ashes." Potash was used as an ingredient in several fields of manufacturing, such as making glass and soap, dying cloth, and producing both saltpeter and gunpowder. Samuel Hopkins of Pittsford, Vermont is generally misunderstood to be the recipient of this first patent, but the actual recipient was a different Samuel Hopkins from a town north of Baltimore, Maryland. Hopkins left behind a series of manuscripts describing the utility of his discovery of Potash, which is derived from a crude form of potassium carbonate and may be deemed as one of America's first chemicals to become widely used in industrial fields. The third patent was granted to a man named Oliver Evans on December 18, 1790. This patent involved about five individual inventions all related to the manufacture of flour. The fourth patent was granted on January 29, 1791, to Francis Bailey for inventing punches for types; it is the first patent whose existing copy remains in the Patent Office archives. The document is signed by George Washington, Thomas Jefferson, and Edmund Randolph. It contains only the grant and does not detail any specific aspects of the invention and its usage.

== Reasons for amending the act ==
The 1790 Patent Act was amended for several reasons. The examination process required an unreasonable amount of time and soon became criticized by those in charge of administering it, the most vocal member being Thomas Jefferson. Inventors also believed that "patents were too difficult to obtain" under the act. Congress removed the examination process three years after the 1790 Patent Act was passed, and inventions no longer needed to be deemed as "sufficiently useful and important" to be granted a patent. The new act transformed the process of granting patents from initially requiring strict examination by high government officials to requiring no examination at all.

== See also ==
- United States patent law
- Patent Act of 1836
- 1877 U.S. Patent Office fire
