= DPRC =

DPRC may refer to:

- Daytime passive radiative cooling, a solar radiation management strategy for global warming
- District of the People's Republic of China, a Chinese administrative division
- Democratic People's Republic of Choson, an alternative name of North Korea
- Demobilized Personnel Records Center, a former US Army facility
