= X-Patent =

U.S. patent issued prior to July 1836

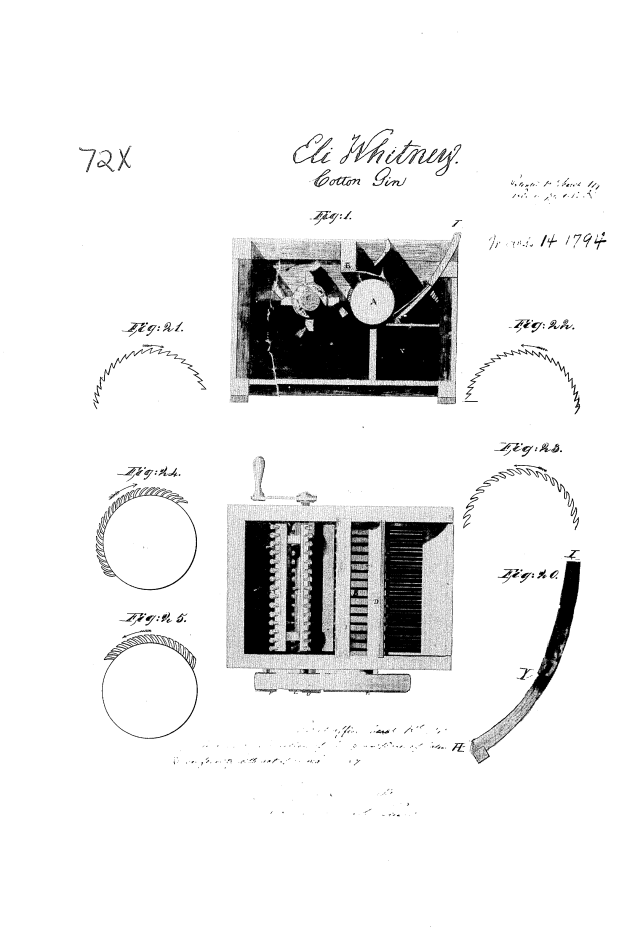
X-Patent number 72, Eli Whitney's cotton gin.

The X-Patents are all the patents issued by the United States Patent and Trademark Office from July 1790 (when the first U.S. patent was issued), to July 1836. The actual number is unknown, but the best estimate is 9,957. The records were burned in a fire, in December 1836, while in temporary storage. No copies or rosters were maintained by the government at the time, leaving only the inventors' copies to reconstruct the collection.

== The USPTO and its earliest days ==
The Patent Commission of the U.S. was created in 1790. Its first three members were Secretary of State Thomas Jefferson, Secretary of War Henry Knox, and Attorney General Edmund Randolph.

On July 31, 1790, inventor Samuel Hopkins of Pittsford, Vermont became the first person to be issued a patent in the United States. His patented invention was an improvement in the "making of Pot Ash by a new apparatus & process."

The Patent Office was the only major government building to survive the British invasion of Washington, D.C., during the War of 1812. This is credited to Dr. William Thornton who was building a musical instrument in the same building. He persuaded British officers that they would be destroying the shared intellectual record of mankind if the patents were burned.

== The 1836 fire ==
The Patent Office 1836 fire occurred on December 15 when the patents were in temporary storage while a new (more fireproof) facility was being built.

== Recovery of the X-Patents ==
The United States Congress immediately passed a law to aid re-issuing of the missing patents after the fire. About 2,800 such patents have been recovered.

Up until five months prior to the fire, U.S. patents had not been numbered, and were identified by titles and dates. The first patent denoted with the serial numbering system still in use today was issued on July 13, 1836, and was given the number 1.

A number of X-Patents were recovered in 2004 from the Dartmouth College archives. Of the 14 found, 10 were granted to Samuel Morey including the first known patent for an internal combustion engine. In 2012 X-patent 7997, Daniel Treadwell's for a "Rope Making, Called an Iron Tail", was found in the Treadwell Papers at Harvard University.

== See also ==
- Patent Office 1877 fire
