= Old Patent Office Building =

Museum building in Washington, D.C.

- Old Patent Office
- U.S. National Register of Historic Places
- U.S. National Historic Landmark
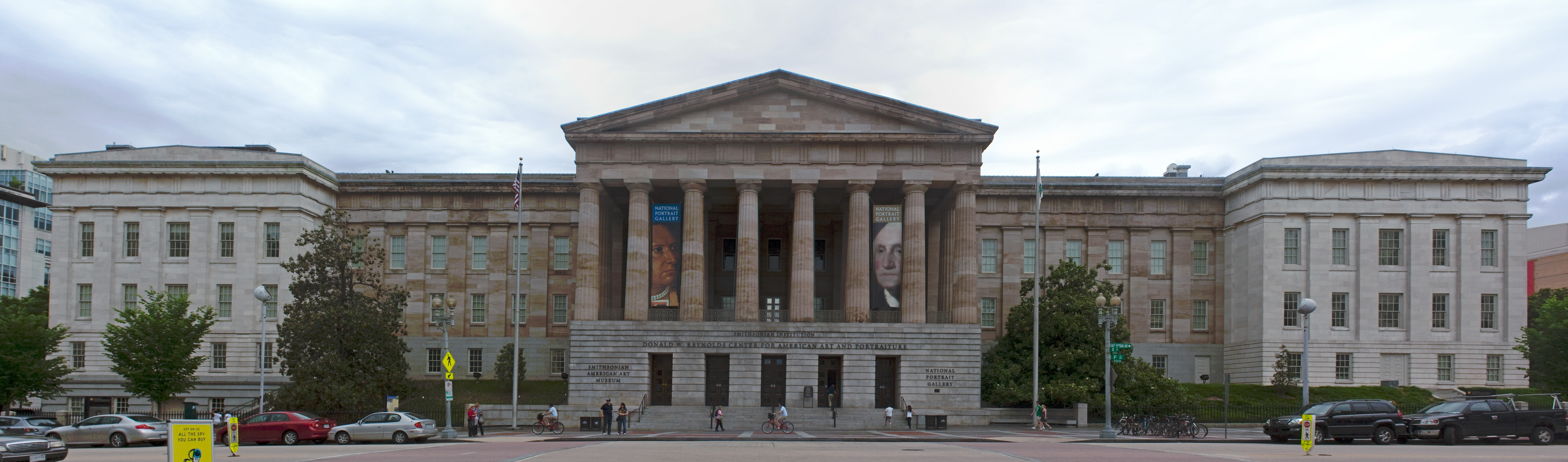
- The Old Patent Office in 2011
- Location: Washington, D.C., U.S.
- Coordinates: 38°53′52.1″N 77°01′22.8″W
- Built: 1867; 159 years ago
- Architectural style: Greek Revival
- Visitation: 1.3 million (2017)
- NRHP reference No.: 66000902

Significant dates
- Added to NRHP: October 15, 1966
- Designated NHL: January 12, 1965

The Old Patent Office Building is a historic building in Washington, D.C. that covers an entire city block between F and G Streets and 7th and 9th Streets NW in the Penn Quarter section of Chinatown. Built 1836–1867 in the Greek Revival style, the building first served as one of the earliest U.S. Patent Office buildings.

The building has housed many U.S. federal government departments, including the first exhibits of the Smithsonian Institution. The structure now houses two Smithsonian art museums: the Smithsonian American Art Museum and the National Portrait Gallery.

== History ==
=== 19th century ===
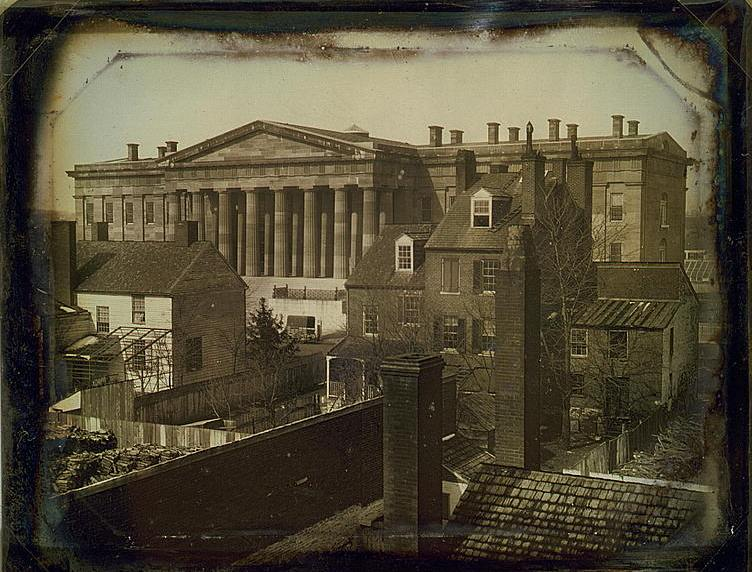
Old Patent Office Building, c. 1846

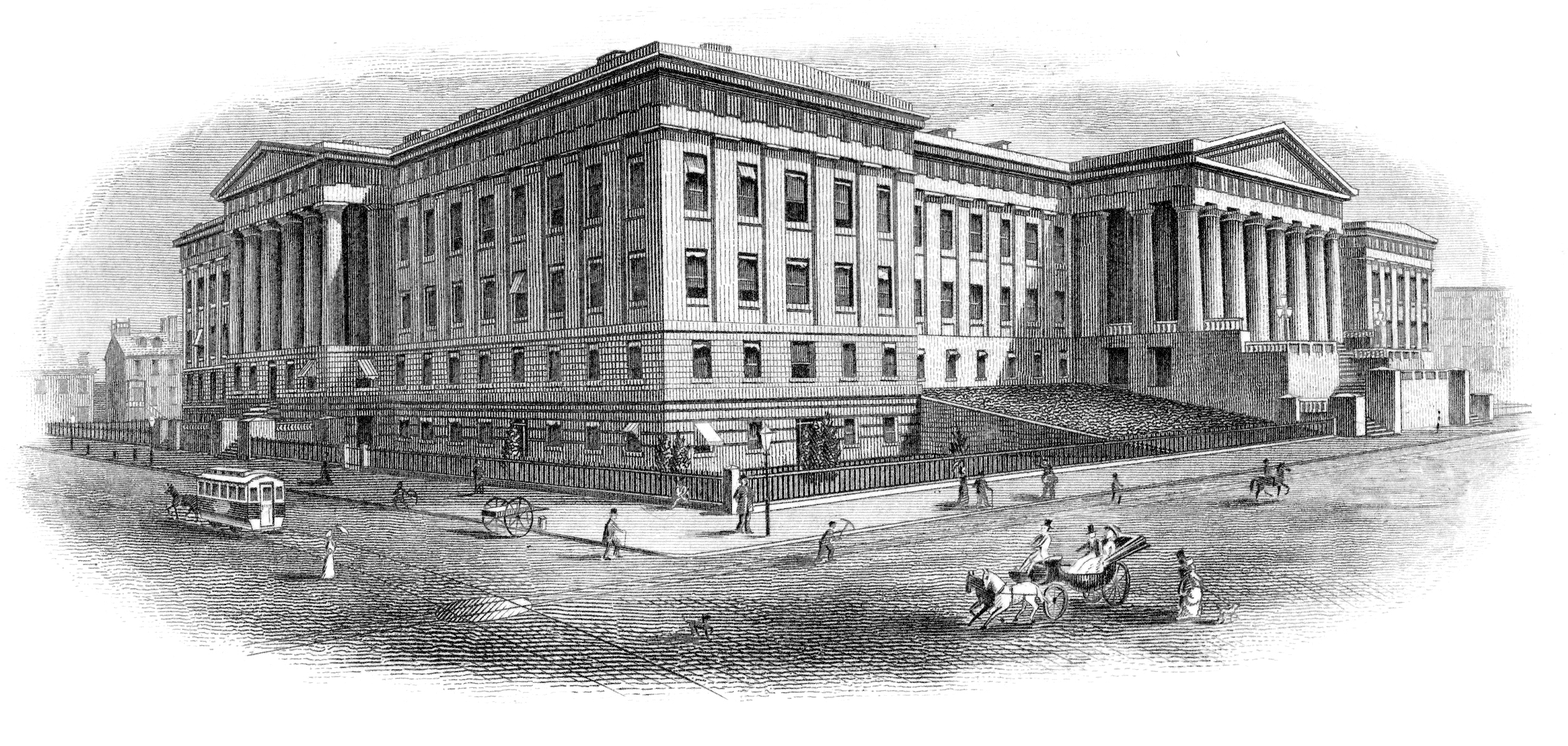
Vignette of the Old Patent Office Building from an 1880s patent certificate

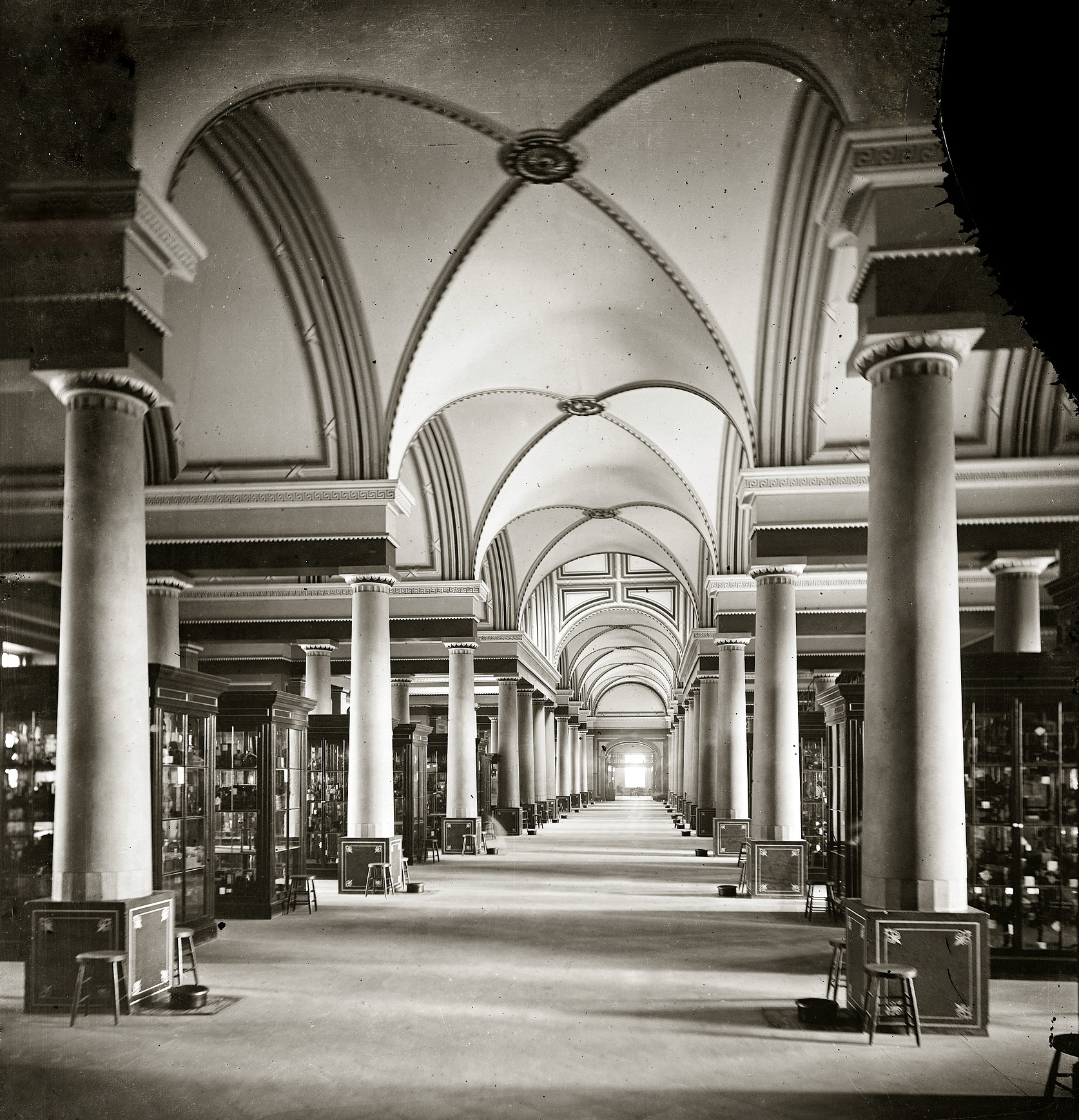
The Old Patent Office Building model room's interior during the American Civil War, c. 1861–1865

Designed in the Greek Revival style by architect Robert Mills, construction started in 1836, and the massive structure took 31 years to complete. United States patent law required inventors to submit scale models of their inventions, which were retained by the Patent Office and required housing.

In Pierre (Peter) Charles L'Enfant's plan for the capital city, the site of the Patent Office Building, halfway between the Capitol and the President's House, was set aside for a monumental structure. L'Enfant envisaged a nondenominational "church of the Republic", which he later modified to a Pantheon devoted to great Americans.

Mills described the proportions of the Greek Revival central portico as "exactly those of the Parthenon of Athens", a departure in Washington, where previously ambitious public buildings had been based on Roman and Renaissance precedents. Fireproofing the design was an essential concern: Mills spanned the interior spaces with masonry vaulting without the use of wooden beams. Skylights and interior light courts filled the spaces with daylight.

After years of political infighting, in which Congressional committees questioned Mills' competence and insisted on design changes that inserted unnecessary supporting columns and tie-rods, Mills was summarily dismissed in 1851. Construction continued under the direction of Thomas U. Walter, one of Mills' harshest critics, and was completed in 1865.

==== United States Patent and Trademark Office ====
The Patent Office was founded in 1834, and it moved to the building in 1842. From 1854 to 1857, Clara Barton worked in the building as a clerk to the Patent Commissioner, the first woman federal employee to receive equal pay.

In 1877 the building's west wing suffered a fire that destroyed some 87,000 patent models; it was restored by Adolf Cluss, 1877–1885, in the style he termed "modern Renaissance" as documented in Patent Office 1877 fire.

==== Civil war ====
During the Civil War, the building was turned into military barracks, hospital, and morgue. Wounded soldiers lay on cots in second-floor galleries, among glass cases holding models of inventions that had been submitted with patent applications. The American poet Walt Whitman frequented "that noblest of Washington buildings" and read to wounded men. The building was chosen as the venue for Lincoln's Second Inaugural Ball in 1865. Whitman worked at the Bureau of Indian Affairs, located in the building, from January 24 to June 30, 1865, before being fired for having a copy of Leaves of Grass in his desk.

=== 20th century ===
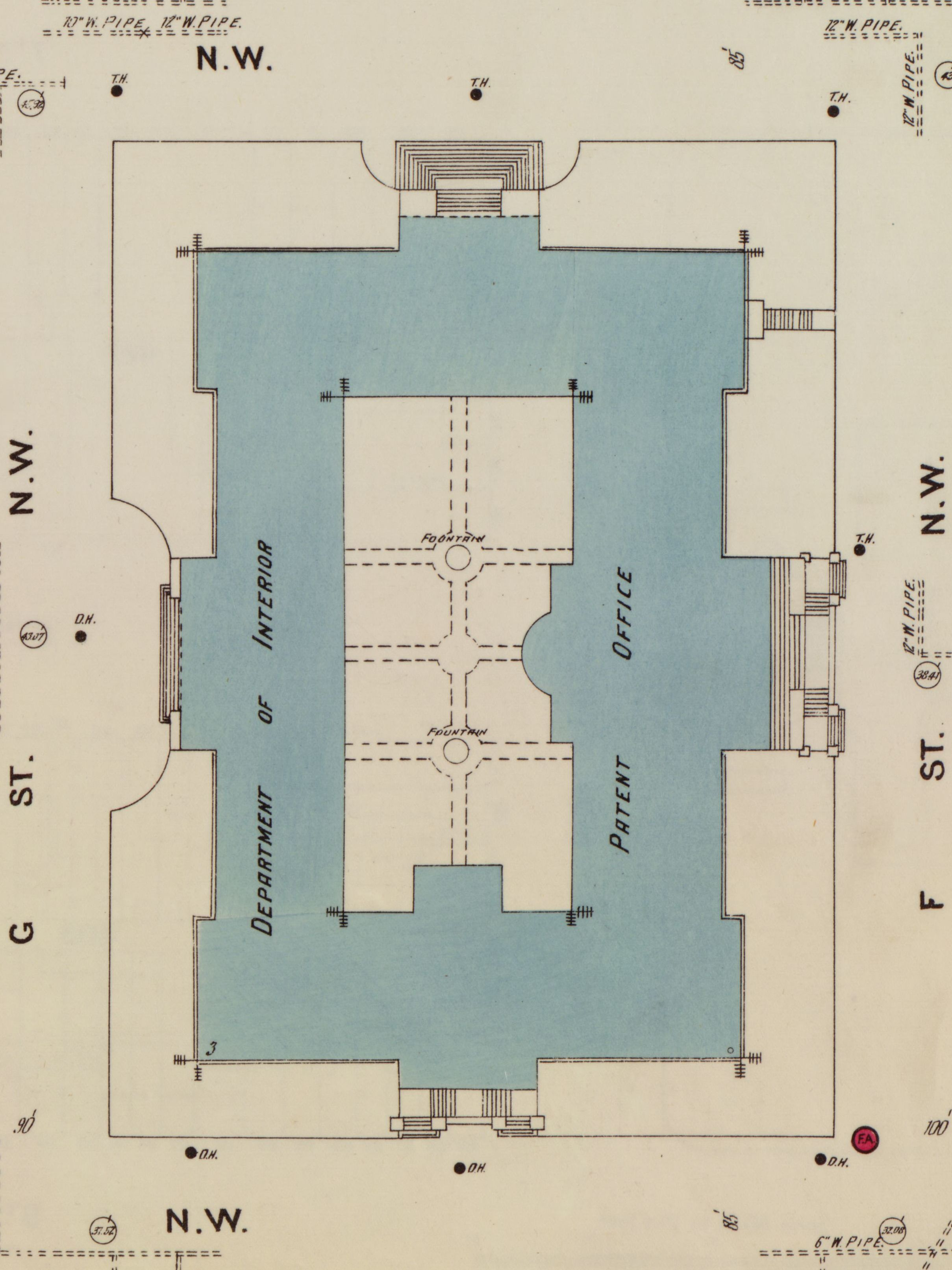
A 1915 Sanborn Fire Insurance map of the building

In the 20th century, the building was occupied by the Patent Office until 1932; it then housed the Civil Service Commission. A street widening sliced away the monumental stairs to its south portico. In 1953, legislation was introduced to demolish the building for a parking lot, but President Dwight D. Eisenhower signed legislation giving it to the Smithsonian in 1958. This was an important victory for the historic preservation movement in the United States.

The Faulkner, Kingsbury & Stenhouse firm of architects supervised the renovation of the interior as museum space starting in 1964. In 1965, the building was designated a National Historic Landmark.

==== National Museum of American Art and the National Portrait Gallery ====
The National Museum of American Art (now the Smithsonian American Art Museum) and the National Portrait Gallery opened in January 1968. The north wing housed the art museum and the south wing housed the portrait gallery. Office space and a café occupied the east wing. The center courtyard had outdoor eating space for the cafe and several large trees.

In 1995, the Smithsonian revealed the Old Patent Office Building was in serious disrepair. The roof leaked; netting had to be placed in some galleries to catch falling ceiling plaster; window frames were rotting; the floor tiles in the Great Hall were crumbling, and the exterior façade was so degraded it was shedding fist-sized pieces of rock.

=== 21st century ===
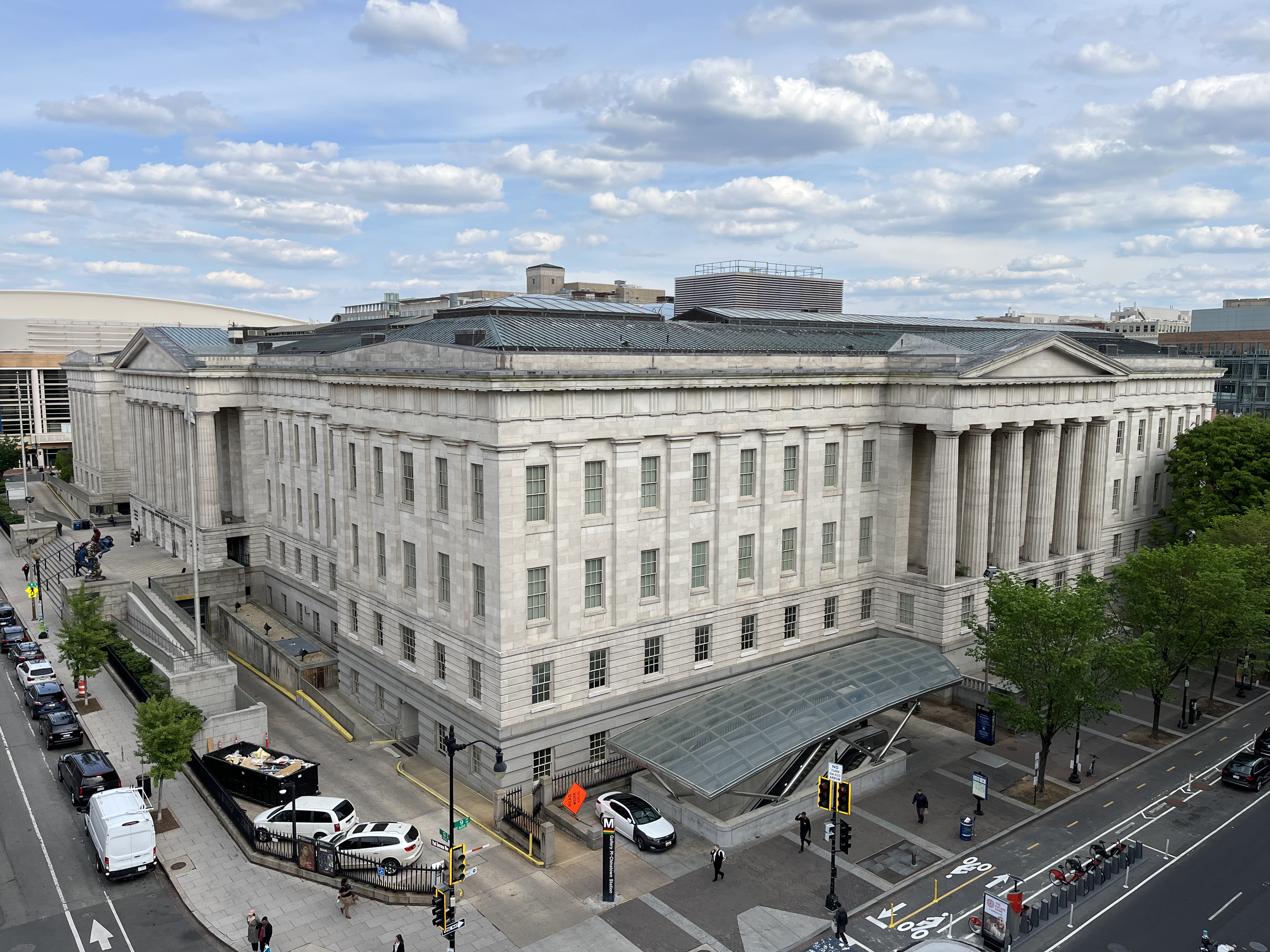
View from the adjacent Martin Luther King Jr. Memorial Library in 2023

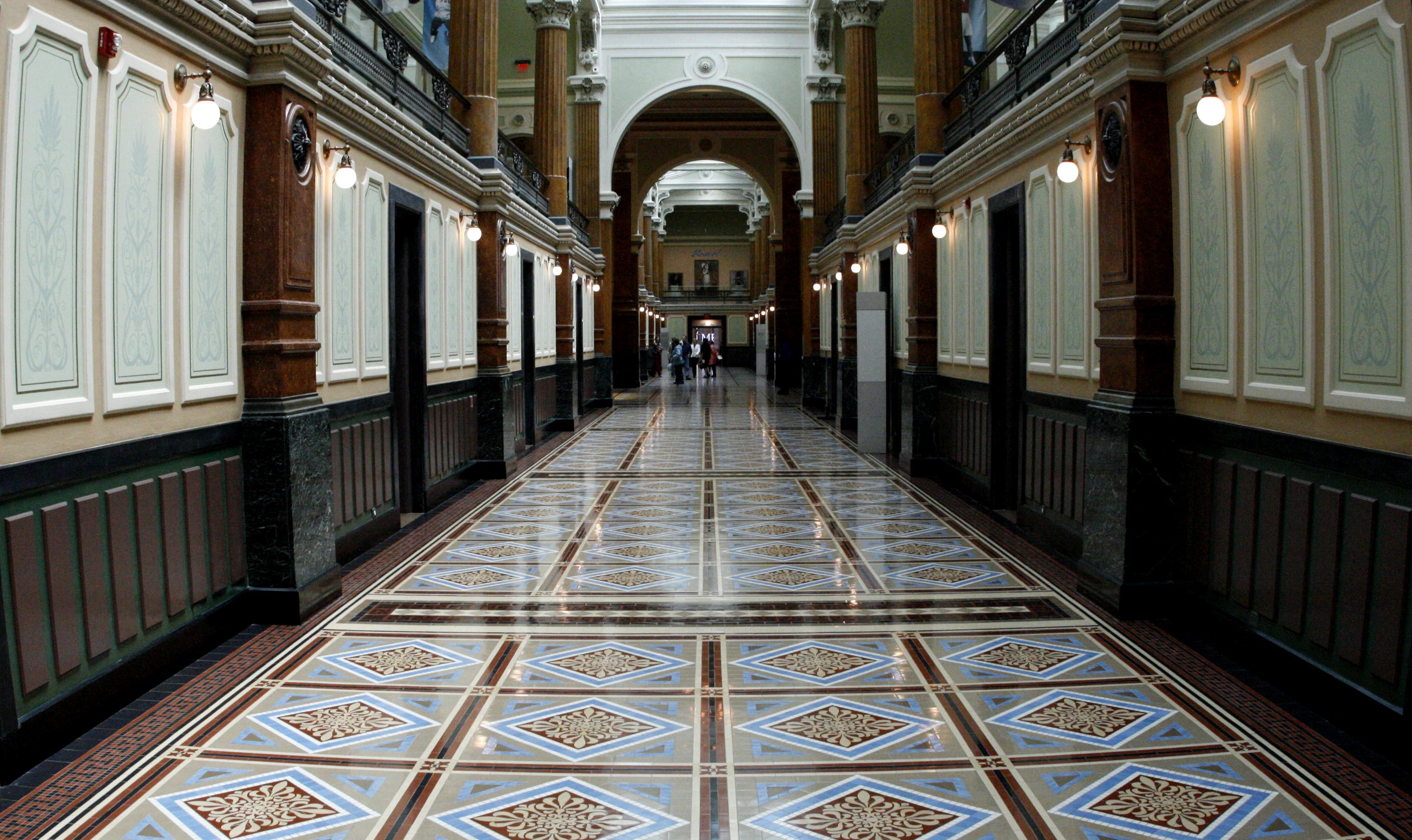
The Old Patent Office model room in 2011, now the Great Hall of the National Portrait Gallery

==== Renovation ====
The building was closed in 2000 for needed repairs. After undergoing extensive renovations, it reopened on July 1, 2006, and was renamed The Donald W. Reynolds Center for American Art and Portraiture in honor of a gift from the Donald W. Reynolds Foundation. The building houses the collections of two Smithsonian museums: the National Portrait Gallery and the Smithsonian American Art Museum.

The Smithsonian announced the building would close in January 2000 for a two-year, $42 million renovation. Hartman-Cox Architects was hired to oversee the conservation and repair. The estimated cost of the renovation then grew, initially in 2000 to $110–120 million.

The 2000 to 2006 renovation included restoring the porticos modeled after the Parthenon in Athens, a curving double staircase, colonnades, vaulted galleries, large windows, and skylights as long as a city block. According to the Smithsonian Institution, "Extraordinary effort was made to use new preservation technologies to restore the historic fabric of the building and re-use historic materials."

Prior to the building's closure in January 2000, a decision was reached to allot about one-third of the building's total space to the National Portrait Gallery while simultaneously eliminating the informal north-south division between the NPG and American Art Museum. This led to acrimony between the two museums, and a public debate about which collection deserved more space. The Smithsonian resolved the dispute practically: Art that best fit an exhibition space got it. (For example, since modern art often tends toward large canvases, this art is on the high-ceilinged third floor.)

By March 2001, the cost of the Old Patent Office renovation rose to $180 million. That month, Nan Tucker McEvoy (a California newspaper heiress and arts patron) donated $10 million for the renovation. The Henry Luce Foundation gave another $10 million later that year. Costs continued to rise, however.

Congress appropriated $33.5 million for the renovation, but the reconstruction costs were estimated at $214 million in June 2001 and the museum not scheduled to reopen until 2005. Just a month later, the reopening was pushed back even further to July 2006.

In 2003, the government's contribution to the renovation rose to $166 million, and more than $40 million in private funds had been raised. Smithsonian officials subsequently began discussing a major change to the renovation design: Adding a glass roof to the open courtyard in the center of the Old Patent Office Building. Congress approved the change in August 2003.

In March 2004, the Smithsonian announced that Foster and Partners, would design the glass canopy.

In November 2004, Robert Kogod (a real estate development executive) and his wife, Arlene (heir to Charles E. Smith Construction fortune) donated $25 million to complete the canopy. By then, costs had risen to $298 million with $60 million in private funds still to be raised.

In early November 2004, the National Capital Planning Commission (NCPC, which has statutory authority to approve all buildings and renovations in the D.C. metropolitan area) approved the preliminary design for the glass canopy. The United States Commission of Fine Arts, an advisory commission on design, approved the canopy in January 2005. Delays in obtaining final NCPC approval and construction materials for the canopy led to a major delay in the roof's installation.

In April 2005, the Smithsonian said that the canopy would not be ready by the time the museum reopened in July 2006, and would be installed in 2007. But opposition to the canopy was rising. The Advisory Council on Historic Preservation (ACHP), a federal agency, opposed enclosing the courtyard; the height of the canopy above the cornice line; the bright lighting of the canopy; and the destruction of the landscaping, fountains, and trees in the courtyard. Opposition was also expressed by the U.S. Department of the Interior, the Washington, D.C. State Preservation Office, and the National Trust for Historic Preservation.

Foster and Partners reduced the height of the canopy and altered the way it would be lit in response to these complaints. They also redesigned the canopy to rest on eight steel pillars rather than resting on the roof of the building. The ACHP said the height and lighting changes were not enough, and that the pillars detracted from the beauty of the courtyard. The design changes, coupled with inflation, raised the cost of the canopy to $50 million from $38 million by April 2005.

NCPC reversed its two previous preliminary approvals and rejected the design for the glass canopy on June 2, 2005. NCPC officials said they were convinced by the concerns raised by preservationists, and condemned the Smithsonian's design approval process for being exclusionary. The 6-to-5 vote forced work to come to a halt on the courtyard and canopy, and required that the Smithsonian restore the courtyard to its original appearance (including reinstallation of two iron fountains). The decision cost the Smithsonian $8 million.

Unwilling to lose the canopy, the Smithsonian brought five alternatives to the NCPC on August 4. Two included a glass canopy with flat roofs. Three others lowered the canopy by an additional 11.5 feet (3.5 m) and redirected the lighting to avoid creating a beacon-like effect for the canopy at night. All the alternatives changed the proposed landscaping of the new courtyard and added water features. At least one retained the iron fountains.

Washington Post architectural critic Benjamin Forgey described the changes as "relatively minor adjustments" and "pretty much the very same design". On September 8, 2005, the NCPC reversed itself yet again. It voted 9-to-2 to accept an alternative which retained the waving glass canopy, eight steel columns (unchanged from the previous design), and nighttime illumination of the previous design. The NCPC also approved the preliminary courtyard landscape design, which was created by noted landscape architect Kathryn Gustafson. Almost none of the complaints raised by historic preservationists were addressed. The delay cost the Smithsonian $10 million.

In October 2005, the Donald W. Reynolds Foundation made another major gift, donating $45 million to finish both the building renovation and the canopy manufacture and installation (now scheduled to be complete in July 2007 or later). The Smithsonian agreed to call the two museums, the conservation center, courtyard, storage facility, and other operations within the Old Patent Office complex the "Donald W. Reynolds Center for American Art and Portraiture" in appreciation for the gift.

The Smithsonian said it would call its conservation laboratory the Lunder Conservation Center after receiving a $5.7 million grant from the Harold Alfond Foundation, name the new 356-seat underground auditorium after Nan Tucker McEvoy; designate the courtyard the Robert and Arlene Kogod Courtyard; and name its "open storage" facility the Luce Foundation Center. The two museums would retain their names, however. The Reynolds Foundation donation left just $20 million to be raised.

==== Reopening ====
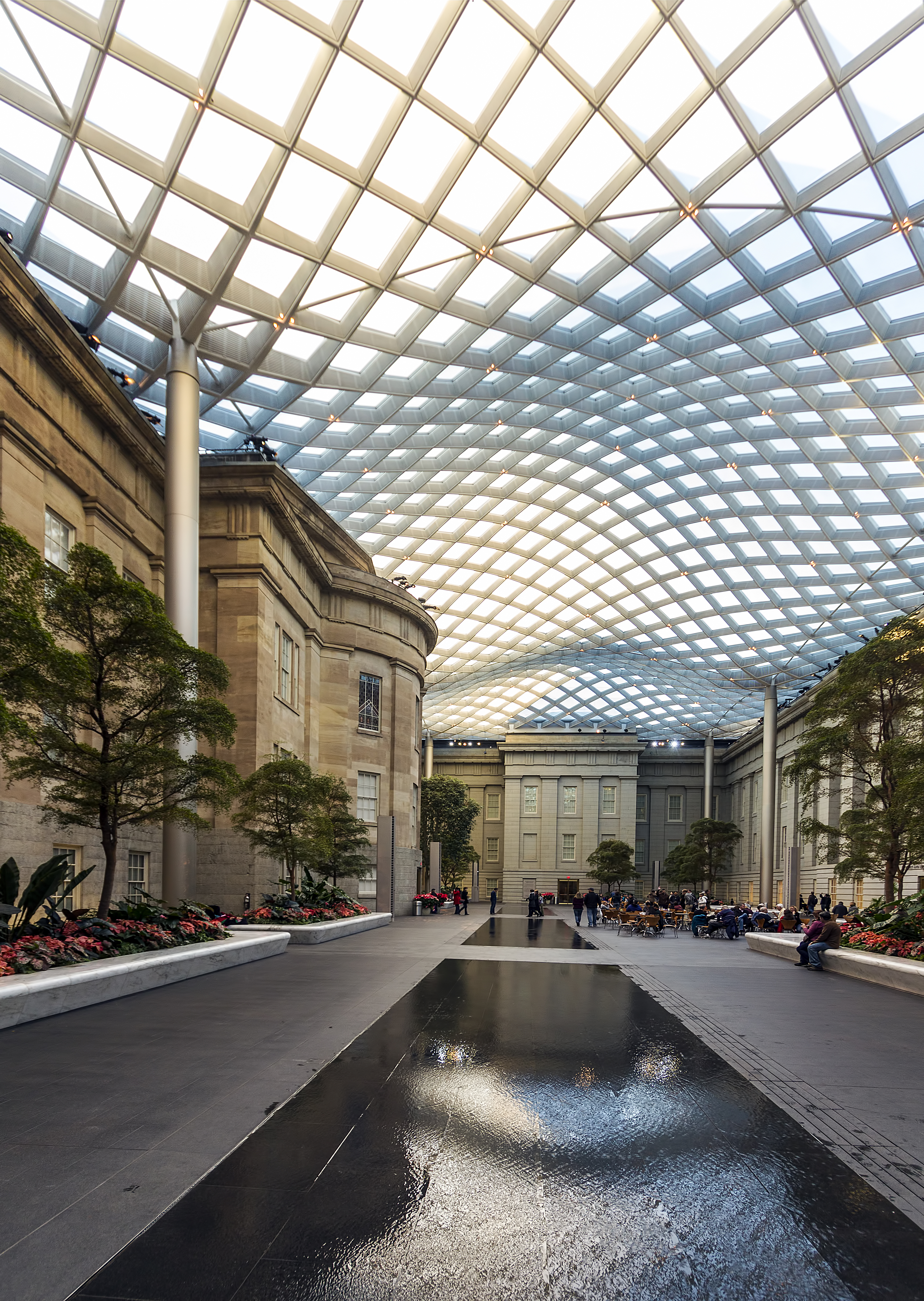
The Kogod Courtyard in 2012

The National Portrait Gallery and Smithsonian American Art Museum reopened on July 1, 2006. The total cost of the building's renovation was $283 million.

In 2007, following its conclusion, Washington Post critic Philip Kennicott called the courtyard a "compelling and peaceful public space". Historic preservationists, he observed, were wrong in assuming the glass canopy would turn attention away from the building. To the contrary, he said, "the glass canopy enhances it, drawing out the sandy color and texture of the south wing...and the greenish-gray granite hues of the north wing" and allowing the details and lines of the building to come into higher relief. He called the courtyard's landscaping "resplendent" and the four floor-level water scrims "captivating". He concluded, "Now that it's finished, it's unfortunate that the canopy isn't more visible from the outside (you need to be above street level, in an adjacent building, to see it clearly, and it can be glimpsed peeking above the roofline if seen from a few blocks away). Opponents of the canopy helped ensure that it would be all but invisible from the street. They were wrong. It deserves to be seen."

In 2008, the building was named one of the "new seven wonders of the architecture world" by Condé Nast Traveler magazine.

== See also ==
- National Register of Historic Places listings in central Washington, D.C.
- List of National Historic Landmarks in Washington, D.C.
- List of most-visited museums in the United States
- Architecture of Washington, D.C.
- Patent Office 1836 fire
- Patent Office 1877 fire
- United States Patent and Trademark Office

== Bibliography ==
- Goodheart, Adam (July 2006). "Back To The Future: One of Washington's most exuberant monuments – the old Patent Office Building – gets the renovation it deserves". Smithsonian: 40–47. Archived from the original on March 2, 2012.
- Charles J. Robertson, Temple of Invention. A history of the Patent Office.
- "Visitor's Guide and Map", Smithsonian Donald W. Reynolds Center for American Art and Portraiture, 2006
