= National Personnel Records Center fire =

1973 fire in Missouri, United States

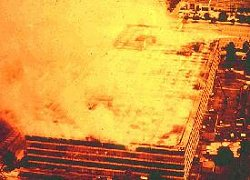
- Fire underway, 1973; aerial view of MILPERCEN, National Archives
- Date: July 12–16, 1973
- Venue: National Personnel Records Center
- Location: Overland, Missouri, United States; 38°41′06″N 90°22′14″W
- Type: Fire
- Cause: Unknown

The National Personnel Records Center fire of 1973, also known as the 1973 National Archives fire, was a fire that occurred at the Military Personnel Records Center (MPRC) in the St. Louis suburb of Overland, Missouri, from July 12 to 16, 1973.

The fire destroyed some 16 million to 18 million U.S. military personnel records. The MPRC, the custodian of U.S. military service records, is part of the National Personnel Records Center, an agency of the National Archives and Records Administration of the General Services Administration.

== Background ==
The NPRC was created in 1956 through the mergers of predecessor agencies after World War II, including the Demobilized Personnel Records Center (DPRC) and the Military Personnel Records Center (MILPERCEN) of the Department of Defense, along with the St. Louis Federal Records Center of the General Services Administration. In final form, the NPRC handled the service records of people in federal civil service or American military service, overseen by the National Archives and Records Administration of the General Services Administration.

In 1951, the Department of Defense hired the Detroit firm of Hellmuth, Yamasaki, and Leinweber, architects, to design a facility for its Demobilized Personnel Records Center. The firm visited several similar operations, including a U.S. Navy records center at Garden City, New York, and a Department of Defense facility in Alexandria, Virginia, to study their functions and storage systems. Their February 1952 report detailed different approaches, including fire prevention, detection, and suppression systems. The Naval records center, for example, was outfitted with a full fire sprinkler system, while the Department of Defense facility was not. This reflected a debate among archivists and librarians: are documents at greater risk in a facility with sprinklers, which could cause water damage, or in one without sprinklers to guard against fire damage?

Department of Defense officials approved a design plan that omitted sprinklers and heat and smoke detectors. Moreover, each floor had large spaces for records storage stretching hundreds of feet and containing no firewalls or other measures to limit the spread of fire.

Set on a site of 70 acres (28 ha), the building had six floors, each measuring 728 ft × 282 ft (222 m × 86 m) and encompassing 205,296 sq ft (19,072.6 m^{2}) for a total of 1,231,776 sq ft (114,435.7 m^{2}). The building was constructed of prestressed concrete floors and roof supported by concrete interior columns and surrounded by a curtain wall of aluminum and glass. Along the north side of each floor were offices, separated from the records storage area by a concrete block wall.

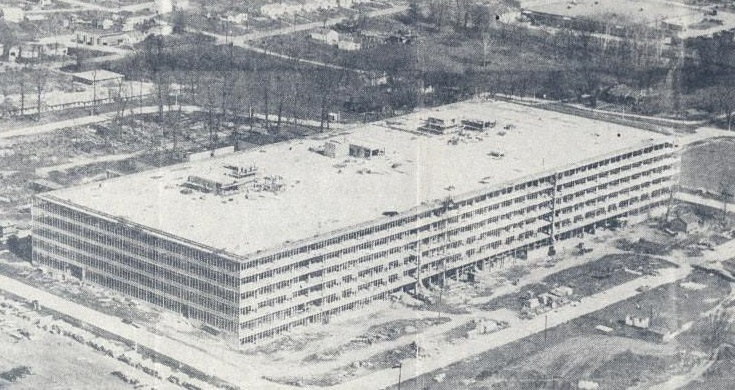
The Military Personnel Records Center upon its opening in 1955

Construction was completed in 1956 by the United States Army Corps of Engineers at a cost of $12.5 million ($148,026,000 today).

When the facility opened in 1956, it housed some 38 million military personnel records. By the time of the 1973 fire, it held more than 52 million personnel records plus some 500,000 cubic feet (14,000 cubic metres) of military unit records. The center's staff had grown past 2,200 personnel, including GSA management and staff as well as military and civilian personnel from the Army, Navy, Air Force, Marines, the Army Reserve, the FBI, and others.

== Fire ==
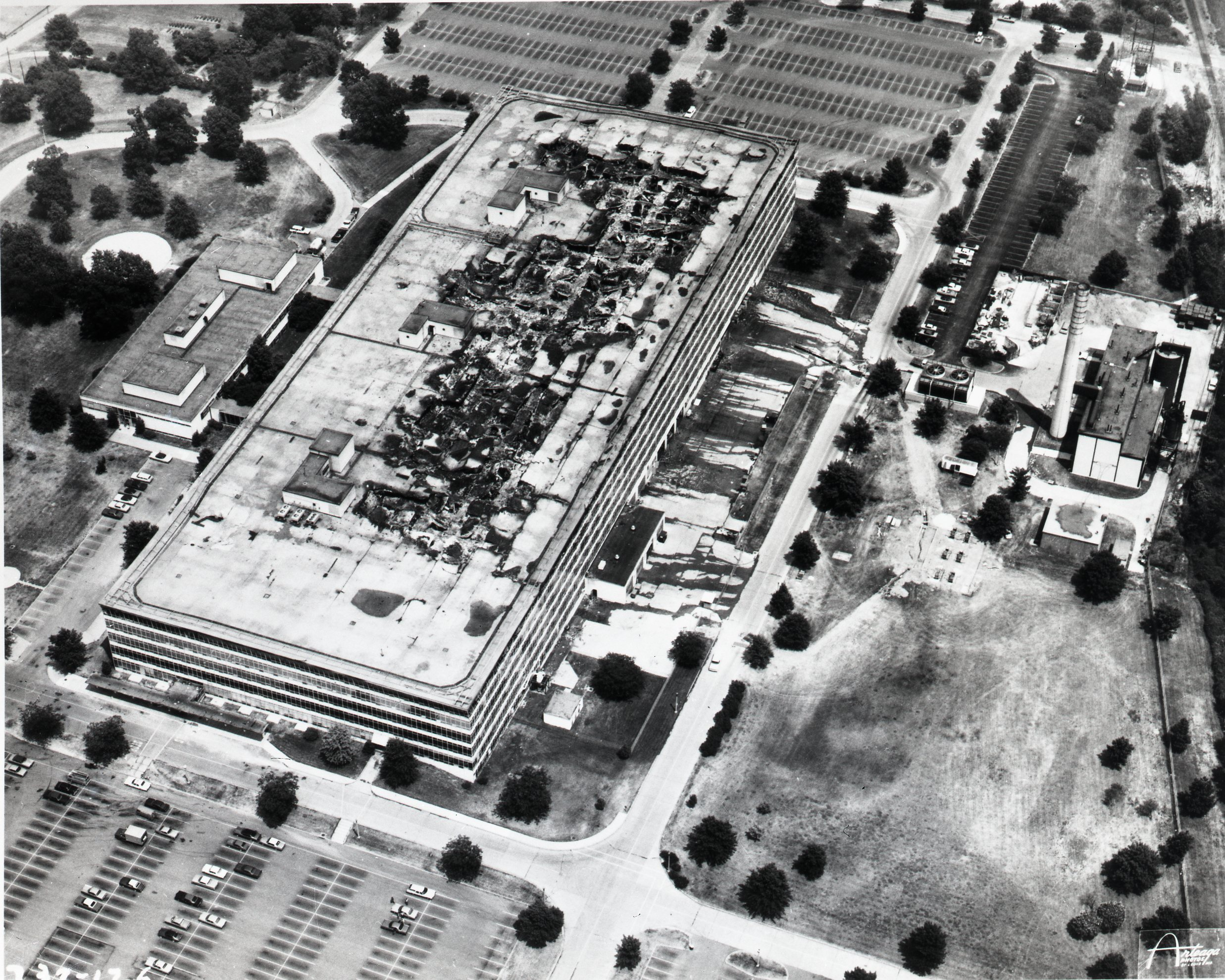
Damage to the building following the fire

At 12:16:15 a.m. on July 12, 1973, the Olivette Fire Department reported to its dispatcher that the NPRC building was on fire. At 12:16:35, 20 seconds later, a building security guard picked up the fire phone and relayed the report of a passing motorcyclist who also observed the fire. By 12:17:25, the first fire trucks were dispatched: three pumpers and two other emergency vehicles from the Community Fire Protection, arriving at 12:20:35. Forty-two fire districts ultimately helped put out the fire.

Heat and smoke within compelled firefighters to withdraw from the building's interior at 3:15 a.m.

The fire burned out of control for 22 hours while firefighters fought from the exterior of the building. Insufficient water pressure plagued efforts and a pumper broke down mechanically in its 40th continuous hour of operation. Crews entered the building again on July 14; the fire smoldered for another two days. The fire was declared out on the morning of July 16, but crews continued using spray to suppress rekindling until the end of the month.

=== Cause ===
The exact cause of the fire was not fully determined. A custodian admitted in October 1973 that he had been smoking in the file room and stubbed out his cigarette on a shelf, and he assumed the fire started because of his actions. The case was presented to a grand jury, but the custodian was not arrested. Deliberate arson was ruled out as a cause almost immediately by investigators, as interviews of some personnel who had been in the building just 20 minutes before the first fire alarm reported nothing out of the ordinary. In 1974, investigators of the General Services Administration stated that an electrical short was most likely the cause of the fire but that, owing to the near-total destruction of the sixth floor, where the fire had occurred, a specific investigation into the electrical systems was impossible.

== Affected records ==
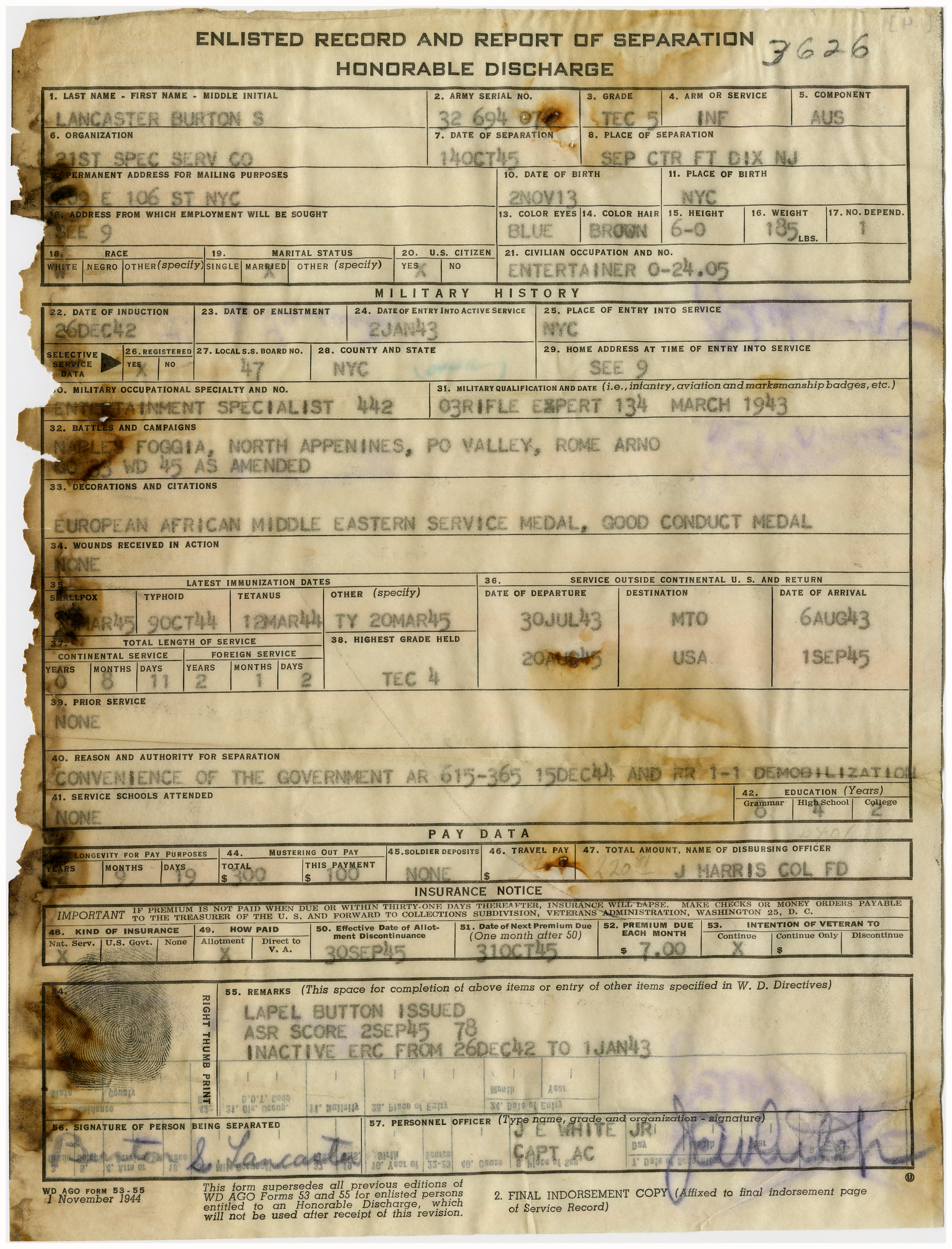
The separation document of Burt Lancaster, one of the publicly accessible records at the National Archives. The burned edges are the result of the 1973 fire.

The losses to federal military records collection included:

- 80% loss to records of U.S. Army personnel discharged November 1, 1912, to January 1, 1960;
- 75% loss to records of U.S. Air Force personnel discharged September 25, 1947, to January 1, 1964, with names alphabetically after Hubbard, James E.;
- Some U.S. Army Reserve personnel who performed their initial active duty for training in the late 1950s but who received final discharge as late as 1964.

None of the records that were destroyed in the fire had duplicate copies made, nor had they been copied to microfilm. No index of these records was made prior to the fire, and millions of records were on loan to the Veterans Administration at the time of the fire. This made it difficult to precisely determine which records were lost.

=== Navy and Marine Corps records ===
On the morning of the National Archives Fire, a very small number of U.S. Navy, Coast Guard, and Marine Corps records were out of their normal file area, being worked on as active requests by employees of the National Archives and Records Administration who maintained their offices on the sixth floor of the building. When the NPRC fire began, these Navy and Marine Corps records were caught in the section of the building which experienced the most damage in the fire.

The exact number of Navy and Marine Corps records destroyed in the fire is unknown, since such records were being removed only for a few days while information was retrieved from them and were not normally stored in the area of the building that experienced the fire. Estimates indicate that the number of affected records was no more than two to three dozen. Such records are considered "special cases," and no accounting could be made of which records were affected, so the present policy of NPRC is to state that there were no Navy and Marine Corps records destroyed in the fire and to treat these records as records that had been lost in ordinary circumstances.

The destroyed sixth floor of the NPRC also housed a security vault that contained high-profile and notable records of U.S. Navy and Marine Corps personnel. Known as the "Sixth Floor Vault," confirmed destroyed records included the Navy file of Greek Prime Minister Andreas Papandreou as well as the record of Adolf Hitler's nephew William Patrick Hitler. The sixth-floor security vault also held all the records of then-current NPRC employees who had their own Navy and Marine Corps records retired at the agency.

== Damage and reconstruction ==
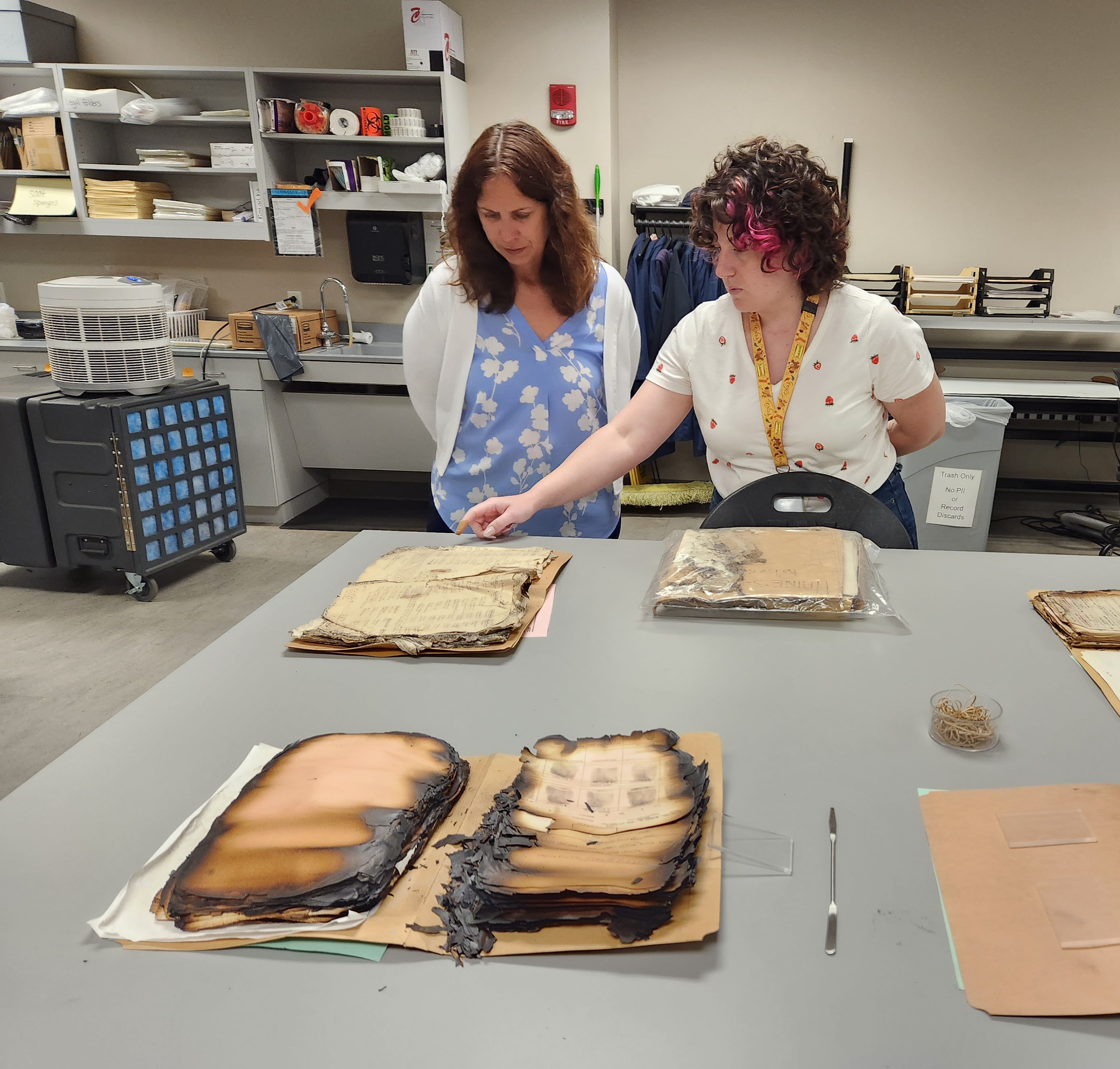
Archivist of the United States Dr. Colleen Shogan inpects damaged records, 2023

The 1973 fire destroyed the entire sixth floor of the National Personnel Records Center and greatly affected the fifth floor with water damage. As part of the reconstruction, the entire sixth floor was removed owing to the extensive damage, resulting in the current structure's now consisting of five floors. The rehabilitated building has firewalls to divide the large, open records storage areas. Smoke detection and sprinkler systems have also been added to prevent a repetition of the 1973 fire. Signs of the fire can still be seen today.

A massive effort to restore destroyed service records began in 1974. In most cases where a military record has been presumed destroyed, NPRC is able to reconstruct basic service information, such as military date of entry, date of discharge, character of service, and final rank. Information is still being recovered from burnt files into the 2020s, especially with the aid of infrared cameras that can read blackened paper.

== See also ==
- 1836 U.S. Patent Office fire
- 1877 U.S. Patent Office fire
