= Patent Act of 1836 =

Act that made important changes in the United States patent system

- Long title: An Act to promote the progress of the useful arts, and to repeal all acts and parts of acts heretofore made for that purpose
- Enacted by: the 24th United States Congress
- Effective: July 4, 1836

Citations
- Statutes at Large: 5 Stat. 117

Codification
- Acts repealed: Patent Act of 1793

Legislative history
- Committee consideration by Senate Select Committee on the Patent Office; Signed into law by President Andrew Jackson on July 4, 1836

The Patent Act of 1836 (Pub. L. 24–357, 5 Stat. 117, enacted July 4, 1836) established a number of important changes in the United States patent system. These include:

- The examination of patent applications prior to issuing a patent. This was the second time this was done anywhere in the world. The previous occasion was in the United States from 1790 to 1793 under the Patent Act of 1790. Previously, patents were issued on all applications, even if they were direct copies of earlier patents. It was left to the courts to decide validity in the event of a lawsuit.
- The option of extending an existing patent's term for an additional seven years, making the maximum term of patent 21 years. (This was abolished in 1861 and replaced with a single 17-year term.)
- The hiring of professional patent examiners. Initially only one examiner was hired, but soon a second one was hired to handle the increased workload.
- The establishment of a library of prior art to assist in examinations.

Until the passage of this Act, the president was responsible for signing each individual patent. Working on this operational bottleneck and seeing the opportunity for growth, president Jackson issued a Special Message on April 4, 1832, recommending the purchase of a new building for employees of the Patent Office. Finally, when the Act passed in 1836, it included provisions that improved internal processes such as anti-fraud checking, more integration with the State Department, and additional hurdles like a merit examination for applicants.

== See also ==
- United States patent law
- 1836 U.S. Patent Office fire
- Patent Office 1877 fire
