= Petr Taborsky =

Petr Táborský was the first person in the United States to be prosecuted in criminal court for stealing intellectual property. The property in question was research by a team Taborsky was part of while he was a student at the University of South Florida. Taborsky was eventually found guilty.

== Discovery ==
In 1988, Taborsky was a chemistry student working at the University of South Florida as an assistant researcher on an unsuccessful project sponsored by Florida Progress Corporation. At the end of the designated research period, he claimed to have obtained permission from a dean in the College of Engineering to conduct his own experiments using a different approach, hoping to use the material for a master's thesis. His independent research at the university's lab led to an important discovery that could be applied to filter ammonia from polluted water.

Both the university and the Florida Progress Corporation claimed the invention as theirs because it was made using their laboratory. They also claimed that Taborsky was not entitled to any compensation for having made the discovery. Taborsky disagreed and responded by taking the research notes from the laboratory. He used these notes to apply for patent, which was awarded to him.

== Criminal charges and conviction ==
The university eventually brought criminal charges against Taborsky and in 1990 he was found guilty of theft of the university's intellectual property in the form of $20,000 worth of research and trade secrets. It was the first such case to be tried in the United States.

Taborsky refused to comply with a judge's order to transfer ownership of his patent to the University of South Florida, and in 1996 he was incarcerated in a maximum security state prison. After two months, he was transferred to a minimum-security work-release center. Although Taborsky was offered clemency by Governor Lawton Chiles, he declined, stating that this would be tantamount to admitting guilt.
