= Patent model =

Type of functional model used to illustrate features of a patent

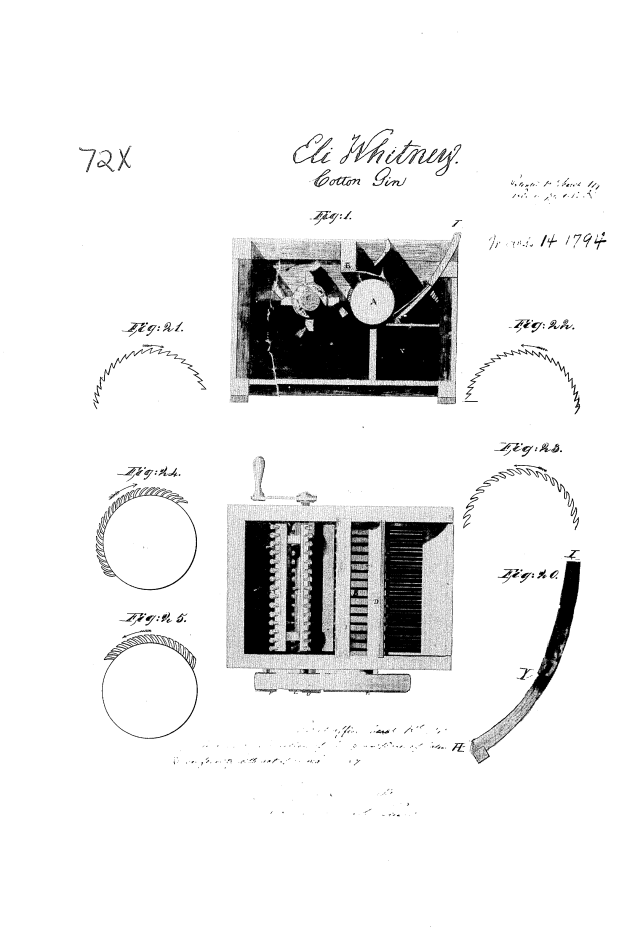
Patent model of Eli Whitney's cotton gin.

A patent model was a handmade miniature model no larger than 12" by 12" by 12" (approximately 30 cm by 30 cm by 30 cm) that showed how an invention works. It was one of the most interesting early features of the United States patent system.

Since some early inventors had little technological or legal training, it was difficult for them to submit formal patent applications which require the novel features of an invention to be described in a written application and a number of diagrams.

== History ==
In the US, patent models were required from 1790 to 1880. The United States Congress abolished the legal requirement for them in 1870, but the U.S. Patent Office (USPTO) kept the requirement until 1880.

On July 31, 1790, inventor Samuel Hopkins of Pittsford, Vermont became the first person to be issued a patent in the United States. His patented invention was an improvement in the "making of Pot Ash by a new apparatus & process." These earliest patent law required that a working model of each invention be produced in miniature.

Some inventors still willingly submitted models at the turn of the twentieth century. In some cases, an inventor may still want to present a "working model" as evidence of actual reduction to practice in an interference proceeding. In some jurisdictions patent models stayed an aid to demonstrate the operation of the invention. In applications involving genetics, samples of genetic material or DNA sequences may be required.

== United States Patent Office's collection of models ==
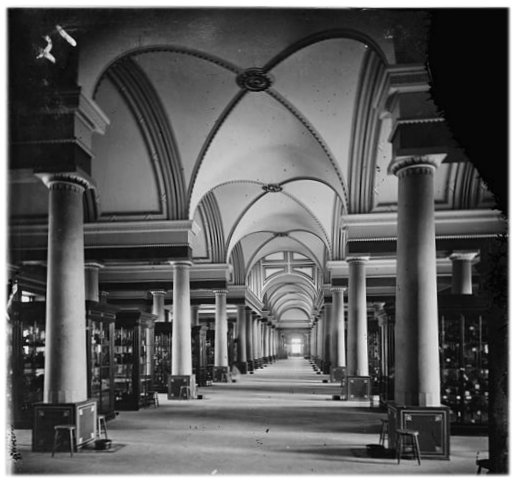
Cases of patent models on view at the U.S. Patent Office in 1861

The United States Patent Office used to publicly display the models of approved patents. This collection of models suffered two major fires- one in 1836, and another in 1877. The 1877 fire destroyed 75,000 patent models.

In 1908, the Patent Office donated just over 1,000 patent models to United States National Museum. The remaining models were packed and moved several times before Congress chose to dissolve the collection in 1926. The Smithsonian Institution was allowed to choose first from the remaining models; accessions from the Patent Office now form part of the collection of over 10,000 patent models at the National Museum of American History.

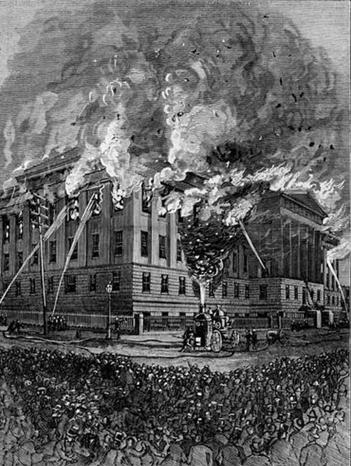
Depiction of the 1877 fire at the U.S. Patent Office, which destroyed 75,000 patent models

Many models were sold off by the patent office in 1925 and were purchased by Sir Henry Wellcome, the founder of the Burroughs-Wellcome Company (now part of GlaxoSmithKline). Although he intended to establish a patent model museum, the stock market crash of 1929 damaged his fortune; the models were left in storage. After his death, the collection went through a number of ownership changes; a large portion of the collection—along with $1,000,000—was donated to the nonprofit United States Patent Model Foundation by Cliff Petersen. Rather than being put into a museum, these models were slowly sold off by the foundation. Much legal wrangling, purchasing, and re-selling ensued. A comparatively small number of models (4,000) were the property of the Rothschild Patent Museum until 2015, when they were transferred to Hagley Museum and Library, forming a part of the museum's collection of patent models. With over 5,000 models, the Hagley's is the largest private collection, and second in size only to the Smithsonian's.

== See also ==
- United States Patent and Trademark Office
- Patent drawing
- 1836 U.S. Patent Office fire
- 1877 U.S. Patent Office fire
