= Demobilized Personnel Records Center =

Coordinates: 38.692194°N 90.265749°W

The Demobilized Personnel Records Center (DPRC) was an installation of the United States Army which operated in St. Louis, Missouri, from 1945 to 1956. The facility was housed in the former Goodfellow ordnance plant in St. Louis and became the central repository for all service records of discharged (but originally not retired) service members of the United States Army.

== History and establishment ==
Prior to World War I, Army service record keeping was decentralized and centered mainly on enlistment, discharge, and muster rolls for regular soldiers, usually kept with local units, while officer service jackets (usually containing letters and correspondence) were typically maintained in the War Department headquarters in Washington, D.C. On November 1, 1912, the Army created the Demobilized Records Branch (DRB) specifically to maintain and consolidate the service records of more than 2.7 million both officers and enlisted personnel separating from active duty.

Over the next twenty years, the Demobilized Records Branch operated out of several buildings in Washington, DC until being forced to relocate to other cities due to space constraints. In 1942, the DRB was renamed as the Demobilized Personnel Records Branch (DPRB) and split into three sections for World War I, World War II, and Organizational Records. The new DPRB was headquartered in Savannah, Georgia with record storage facilities in various other locations across the United States.

== Second World War ==
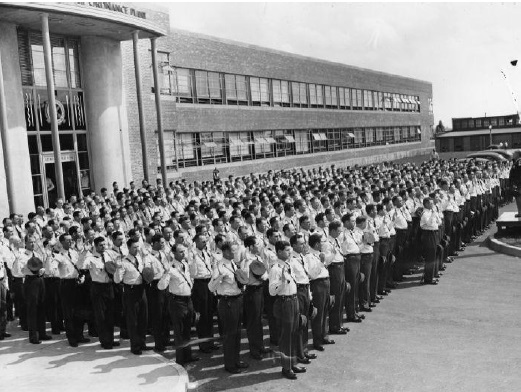
Personnel in front of the DPRC in 1950

As World War II progressed, the vast amount of Army service records required the relocation of all personnel records activities to a new facility in High Point, North Carolina. The new facility now handled all personnel records of the active United States Army, discharged service records of veterans, as well as records of the United States Army Air Forces. Army organizational records remained in Savannah, Georgia.

On September 1, 1945, the Army established the "Records Administration Center, AGO" at the newly minted St. Louis Administration Center, on 4300 Goodfellow Boulevard in St. Louis, Missouri, which had formerly been operated as an ordnance plant during World War II. The facility was originally designated to hold Army civil service personnel and pay records, but in October 1945 all demobilized and discharged World War II service records were transferred to the facility as well. Organizational Records from Savannah, Georgia were transferred later that year while all World War I records were moved in from High Point in March 1946. 19th century and pre-World War I military files remained at various storage facilities in Washington, DC and were at this time being gradually transferred to the National Archives and Records Administration

== Final years ==
By 1948, the Army's record facility in St. Louis had become known as the "Demobilized Personnel Records Center" or DPRC. The center now housed most 20th century military records while the Army Organizational Records Section had been moved to Kansas City in 1950. Army civil service records, maintained at the facility by an office known as the Civilian Personnel Records Branch (CPRB) were then transferred to the authority of the General Services Administration and moved out of the facility on October 29, 1951. What remained at the DPRB were 17 million individual service records of discharged and separated Army and Air Force personnel. Records of retirees were not included and were maintained at the headquarters of the Army and Air Force.

In 1955, the center was designated simply as the "Army Records Center" and relocated to Military Personnel Records Center the following year. The building which housed the DPRC was then reconverted into an ordnance plant before being shut down completely in the 1960s. The building itself was demolished in 2006.
