= Samuel Hopkins (inventor) =

American inventor

U.S. patent X1

Samuel Hopkins (December 9, 1743 – 1818) was an American inventor from Philadelphia, Pennsylvania, On July 31, 1790, he was granted the first U.S. patent, under the new U.S. patent statute just signed into law by President Washington on April 10, 1790. Hopkins had petitioned for a patent on an improvement "in the making of Potash and Pearlash by a new Apparatus and Process."

The statute did not create a Patent Office. Instead a committee of the Secretary of State, Secretary of War and the Attorney General were authorized to make a decision on the merit of a properly documented petition.

The patent was signed by President George Washington, Attorney General Edmund Randolph, and Secretary of State Thomas Jefferson. The other U.S. patents issued that year were for a new candle-making process and Oliver Evans's flour-milling machinery.

Hopkins also received the first "Canadian" patent from the Parliament of Lower Canada in 1791, issued "by the Governor General in Council to Angus MacDonnel, a Scottish soldier garrisoned at Quebec City, and to Samuel Hopkins, for processes to make potash and soap from wood ash."

== Personal details ==
Samuel Hopkins, the second child of Quaker parents, was born just north of Baltimore, Maryland. At about the age of 16, he was apprenticed to Robert Parrish, a Quaker tradesman in Philadelphia. In the spring of 1765, Hopkins married Parrish's sister-in-law, Hannah Wilson, and together they raised six children in Philadelphia. The 1790 U.S. Census listed Hopkins's occupation as "Pott Ash Maker". The city directories of the period listed him as a "pot-ash maker" and a "pot-ash manufacturer".

Circa 1800, for financial reasons, Hopkins and his wife moved to Rahway, New Jersey, to live with their daughter Sarah and son-in-law William Shotwell. They returned to Philadelphia sometime before Hopkins's death in 1818.
