= 1836 U.S. Patent Office fire =

1836 fire in Washington, D.C.

Coordinates: 38°53′49″N 77°1′21″W

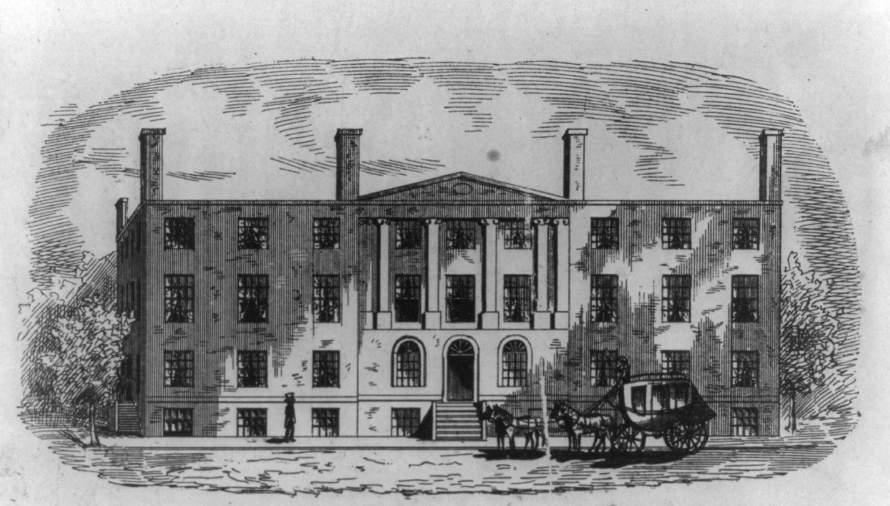
- Blodget's Hotel with stagecoach parked in front, in around 1800s—before 1836 Great Fire
- Date: December 15, 1836
- Location: U.S. Patent Office, Blodget's Hotel, Washington, U.S.
- Outcome: Entirety of the library lost (except one volume)

The 1836 U.S. Patent Office fire was the first of two major fires the U.S. Patent Office has had in its history. It occurred in Blodget's Hotel building, Washington on December 15, 1836. An initial investigation considered the possibility of arson due to suspected corruption in the Post Office, which shared the same building, but it was later ruled out. The cause was ultimately determined to be accidental. The fire is considered to be a unique point in the historical events of the Patent Office that caused policy changes.

Local fire suppression efforts were incapable of preventing the damage due to lack of fire personnel and proper equipment. Many patent documents and models from the preceding three decades were irretrievably lost. As a result of the fire, Congress and the newly legally revamped Patent Office changed the way it handled its record keeping, assigning numbers to patents and requiring multiple copies of supporting documentation.

== History ==
In 1810, Congress authorized the purchase of the unfinished Blodgett's Hotel from its builder to house the Post and Patent offices. Congress was aware of the fire risk. During an event of the War of 1812, Superintendent Dr. William Thornton convinced officers of the British expeditionary force to spare the Patent Office as they burned most government buildings in the city. Congress funded the covering of the building with a slate roof in 1820. They also purchased a fire engine for protection of the building against fires. Because of those changes the volunteer fire department lost its sense of purpose and was disbanded. The complete firehouse equipped with the fire engine was just down the street. Although equipped with a forcing pump and with riveted leather hose 1,000 feet (300 m) long (all purchased 16 years earlier by Act of Congress), there were no firefighters available.

The fire broke out at 3 a.m. on December 15, 1836. The Patent Office then was located in Blodget's Hotel, as was the fire department and the post office. Patent Office employees stored firewood in the basement of the hotel, near where postal employees disposed of the hot ashes from their fires. Sometime after midnight that morning the hot ashes ignited the firewood. The fire department's hose was old and defective and would not funnel water onto the fire, and running a bucket brigade to put out the building blaze turned out to be ineffective. All 9,957 patents and 7,000 related patent models were lost.

John Ruggles, chairman of the Senate investigating committee, reported that the lost items included 168 folio volumes of records, 26 large portfolios of some nine thousand drawings, related descriptive patent documents, and miscellaneous paperwork. The 7,000 lost models included those of various textile manufacturing processes and several models of steam-powered machinery for propelling boats (including Robert Fulton's original bound folio of full-color patent drawings, done in his own hand). Ruggles said that the documents and models destroyed by the fire represented the history of American invention for fifty years. He also said that the Patent Office's own model-cases, presses and seals, desks, book-cases and office furniture were also destroyed. The entire library of books were lost except one that an employee just happened to have secretly taken home to read, which was Volume 6 of Repertory of Arts & Manufactures (1794).

== Aftermath ==
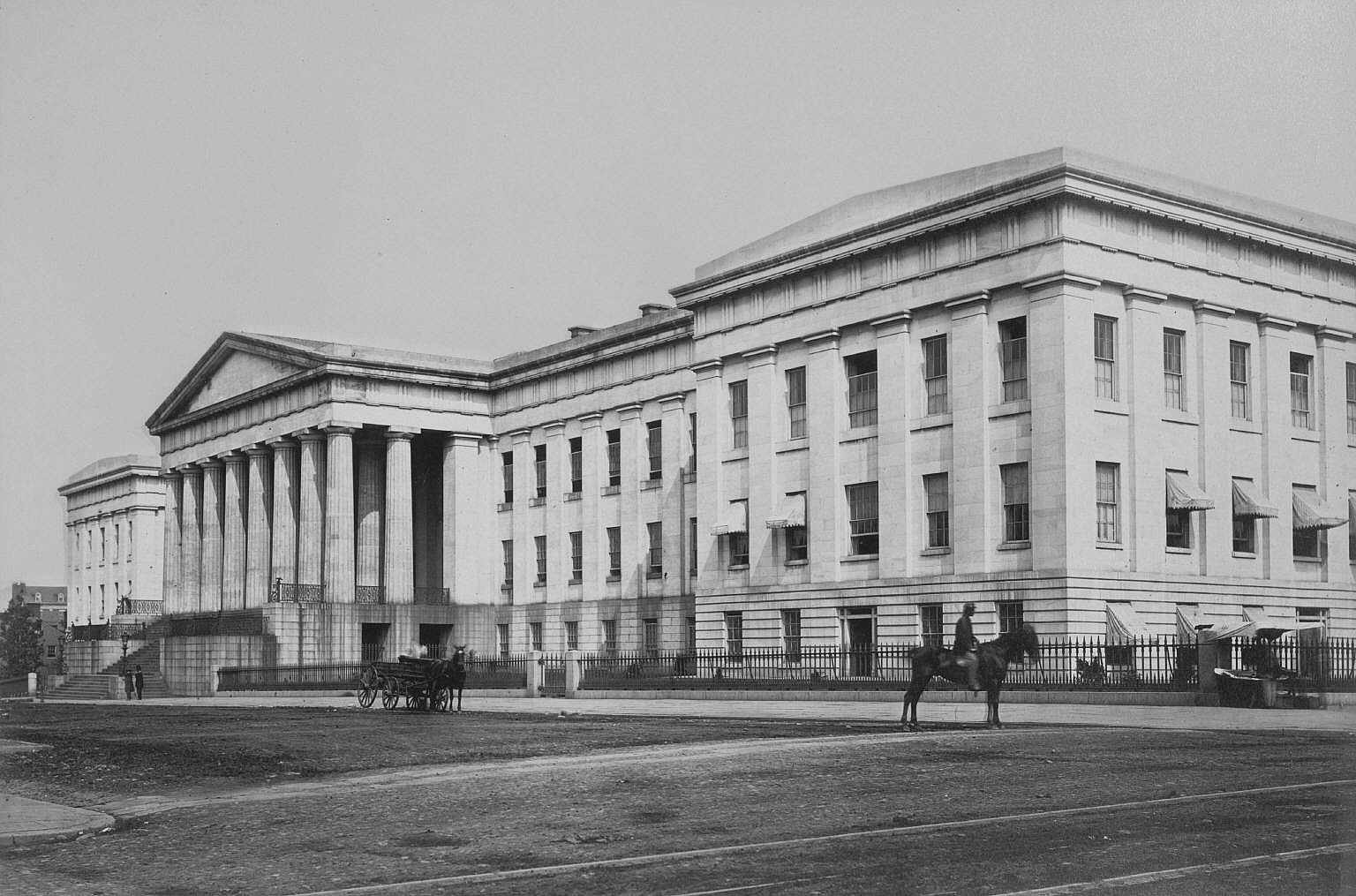
New U. S. Patent Office building constructed after the 1836 Great Fire

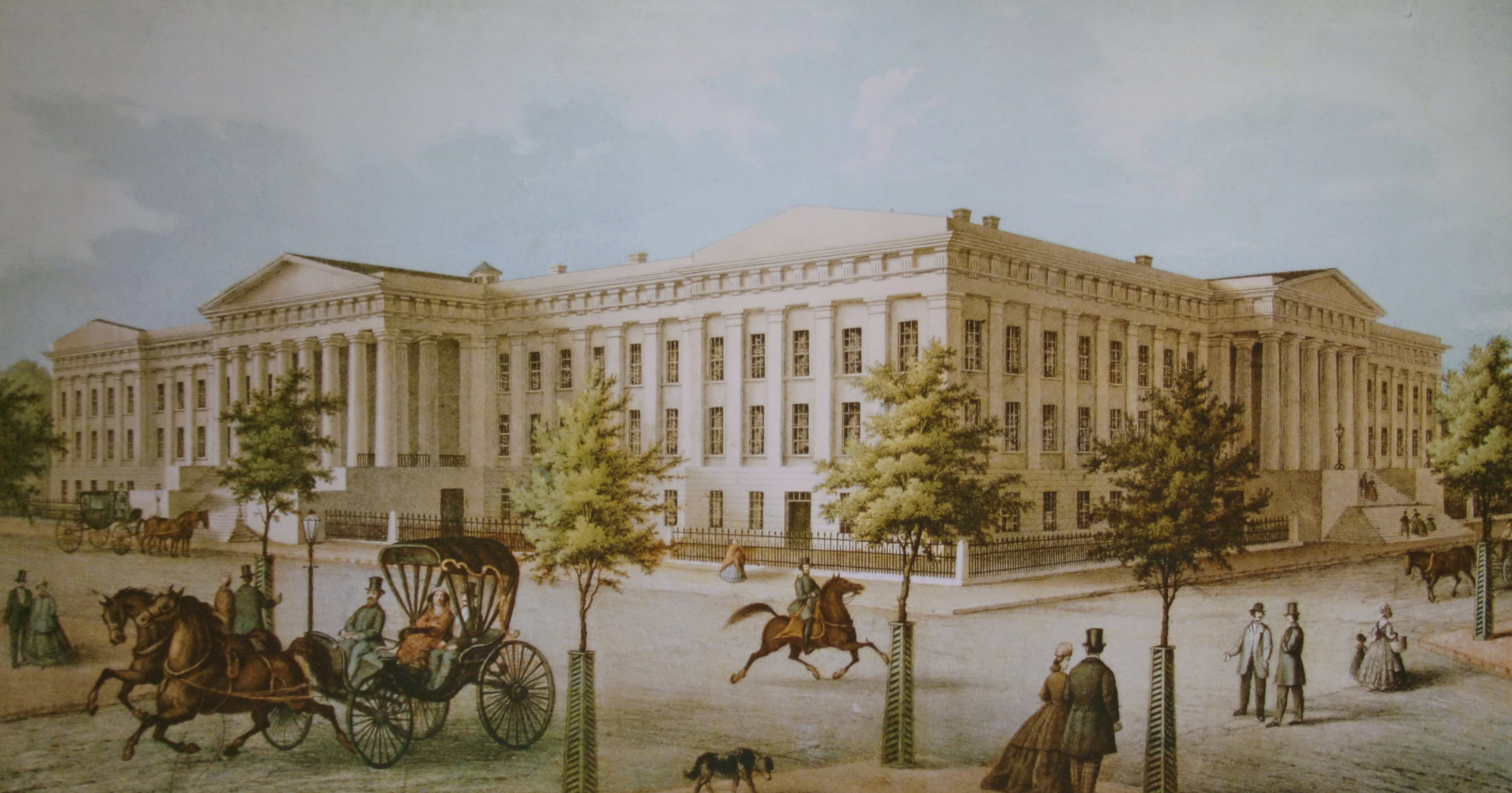
The Patent Office, c. 1855

Congress investigated the fire immediately, suspecting arson. The Post Office Department at the time was already under investigation for allegedly awarding dishonest mail contracts. It was first thought that perhaps the fire was set to destroy evidence. It turned out that the Post Office Department had saved all their documents. Investigators concluded that someone had stored hot ashes in a box in the basement. The live embers then ignited the firewood; no one was identified as having caused the fire. The Patent Office was moved to the old City Hall, at the time the District Courthouse.

The fire occurred when the Patent Act of 1836 was being put into place, which required that patent applications be examined before being granted. An amendment to it the following year required submission of two copies of drawings—one for safekeeping in the patent office; the other attached to the patent grant transmitted to the applicant. The requirement ended in 1870 when the Office began printing complete copies of patents as issued.

All patents from prior to the fire were listed later as X-Patents by the office. The March 3, 1837 Act made provisions to restore the models and drawings lost in the 1836 fire. An amount of $100,000 was appropriated as a budget. Around 9,957 patent records and some 7,000 invention models were lost. One method of restoration was by getting back a duplicate from the original inventor. By 1849 the restoration process was discontinued and it was determined that $88,237.32 had been spent from the budget allowed. Of the estimated 9,957, only 2,845 patent records were restored. Congress solicited for the restoration of the lost patents and appropriated monies for this purpose. It is difficult for modern researchers to find those patents because many of the related documents were burned.

In the aftermath of the fire, the way patents were identified was changed. Previously, patent records were not numbered and could be researched only by the date of patent or inventor's name. After the fire, unique numbers were issued by the Patent Office for each new patent. The Patent Office through the Patent Act of 1836 became its own organization under the United States Department of State. Henry Leavitt Ellsworth became its first Commissioner in 1835. He immediately began construction of a new fire-proof building, that was not completed until 1864. A fire in 1877 destroyed the west and north wing of the new building and caused even more damage.

== See also ==
- 1877 U.S. Patent Office fire
- 1973 National Archives Fire

== Bibliography ==
=== References ===
- Ames, Mary Clemmer (1912). Ten Years In Washington. Washington D.C.: U.S. Government Printing Office. ISBN 978-3-8496524-2-5.
- Beresford, R. (1886). Brief History United States Patent Office. Washington, D.C.: U.S. Government Printing Office. OCLC 25102600.
- Campbell, Levin H. (1891). The patent system of the United States. Washington, D.C.: McGill & Wallace. OCLC 80023090.
- Cleveland, Frederick Albert (1912). United States Congressional Serial Set. Washington, D.C.: U.S. Government Printing Office. OCLC 27268551.
- Dobyns, Kenneth W (2016). The Patent Office pony. U.S. Government Printing Office. ISBN 978-1-9427959-1-9.
- Keim, DeB Randolph (1874). Keim's Illustrated Guide to Museum of Models of Patent Office. U.S. Government Printing Office. OCLC 681967046.
- Niemann, Paul (2006). More Invention Mysteries. Quincy, IL: Horsefeathers Publishing Company. ISBN 978-0-9748041-1-8.
- United States, Patent Office (1956). The story of United States Patent Office, 1790–1956. Washington, D.C.: U.S. Government Printing Office. OCLC 1035200228.
