= List of United States Supreme Court cases, volume 22 =

Supreme Court of the United States
- Interactive map of Supreme Court of the United States
- 38°53′26″N 77°00′16″W
- Established: March 4, 1789; 237 years ago
- Location: Washington, D.C.
- Coordinates: 38°53′26″N 77°00′16″W
- Composition method: Presidential nomination with Senate confirmation
- Authorised by: Constitution of the United States, Art. III, § 1
- Judge term length: life tenure, subject to impeachment and removal
- Number of positions: 9 (by statute)
- Website: supremecourt.gov

This is a list of cases reported in volume 22 (9 Wheat.) of United States Reports, decided by the Supreme Court of the United States in 1824.

== Nominative reports ==
In 1874, the U.S. government created the United States Reports, and retroactively numbered older privately published case reports as part of the new series. As a result, cases appearing in volumes 1–90 of U.S. Reports have dual citation forms; one for the volume number of U.S. Reports, and one for the volume number of the reports named for the relevant reporter of decisions (these are called "nominative reports").

=== Henry Wheaton ===
Starting with the 14th volume of U.S. Reports, the Reporter of Decisions of the Supreme Court of the United States was Henry Wheaton. Wheaton was Reporter of Decisions from 1816 to 1827, covering volumes 14 through 25 of United States Reports which correspond to volumes 1 through 12 of his Wheaton's Reports. As such, the dual form of citation to, for example, The Margaret is 22 U.S. (9 Wheat.) 421 (1824).

== Justices of the Supreme Court at the time of 22 U.S. (9 Wheat.] ==
The Supreme Court is established by Article III, Section 1 of the Constitution of the United States, which says: "The judicial Power of the United States, shall be vested in one supreme Court . . .". The size of the Court is not specified; the Constitution leaves it to Congress to set the number of justices. Under the Judiciary Act of 1789 Congress originally fixed the number of justices at six (one chief justice and five associate justices). Since 1789 Congress has varied the size of the Court from six to seven, nine, ten, and back to nine justices (always including one chief justice).

When the cases in 22 U.S. (9 Wheat.) were decided, the Court comprised these seven justices:

Portrait	Justice	Office	Home State	Succeeded	Date confirmed by the Senate (Vote)	Tenure on Supreme Court
	John Marshall	Chief Justice	Virginia	Oliver Ellsworth	January 27, 1801 (Acclamation)	February 4, 1801 – July 6, 1835 (Died)
	Bushrod Washington	Associate Justice	Virginia	James Wilson	December 20, 1798 (Acclamation)	November 9, 1798 (Recess Appointment) – November 26, 1829 (Died)
	William Johnson	Associate Justice	South Carolina	Alfred Moore	March 24, 1804 (Acclamation)	May 7, 1804 – August 4, 1834 (Died)
	Thomas Todd	Associate Justice	Kentucky	new seat	March 2, 1807 (Acclamation)	March 3, 1807 – February 7, 1826 (Died)
	Gabriel Duvall	Associate Justice	Maryland	Samuel Chase	November 18, 1811 (Acclamation)	November 23, 1811 – January 12, 1835 (Resigned)
	Joseph Story	Associate Justice	Massachusetts	William Cushing	November 18, 1811 (Acclamation)	February 3, 1812 – September 10, 1845 (Died)
	Smith Thompson	Associate Justice	New York	Henry Brockholst Livingston	December 9, 1823 (Acclamation)	September 1, 1823 – December 18, 1843 (Died)

== Notable Cases in 22 U.S. (9 Wheat.) ==
=== Gibbons v. Ogden ===
Gibbons v. Ogden, 22 U.S. (9 Wheat.) 1 (1824), is a landmark decision in which the Supreme Court held that the power to regulate interstate commerce granted to Congress by the Commerce Clause of the United States Constitution encompassed the power to regulate navigation.

=== United States v. Perez ===
In United States v. Perez, 22 U.S. (9 Wheat) 579 (1824) the Supreme Court held that when a criminal trial results in a hung jury, the Double Jeopardy Clause of the Fifth Amendment does not bar a retrial.

== Citation style ==
Under the Judiciary Act of 1789 the federal court structure at the time comprised District Courts, which had general trial jurisdiction; Circuit Courts, which had mixed trial and appellate (from the US District Courts) jurisdiction; and the United States Supreme Court, which had appellate jurisdiction over the federal District and Circuit courts—and for certain issues over state courts. The Supreme Court also had limited original jurisdiction (i.e., in which cases could be filed directly with the Supreme Court without first having been heard by a lower federal or state court). There were one or more federal District Courts and/or Circuit Courts in each state, territory, or other geographical region.

Bluebook citation style is used for case names, citations, and jurisdictions.

- "C.C.D." = United States Circuit Court for the District of . . .
  - e.g.,"C.C.D.N.J." = United States Circuit Court for the District of New Jersey
- "D." = United States District Court for the District of . . .
  - e.g.,"D. Mass." = United States District Court for the District of Massachusetts
- "E." = Eastern; "M." = Middle; "N." = Northern; "S." = Southern; "W." = Western
  - e.g.,"C.C.S.D.N.Y." = United States Circuit Court for the Southern District of New York
  - e.g.,"M.D. Ala." = United States District Court for the Middle District of Alabama
- "Ct. Cl." = United States Court of Claims
- The abbreviation of a state's name alone indicates the highest appellate court in that state's judiciary at the time.
  - e.g.,"Pa." = Supreme Court of Pennsylvania
  - e.g.,"Me." = Supreme Judicial Court of Maine

== List of cases in 22 U.S. (9 Wheat.) ==
Case Name	Page and year	Opinion of the Court	Concurring opinion(s)	Dissenting opinion(s)	Lower Court	Disposition
Gibbons v. Ogden	1 (1824)	Marshall	Johnson	none	N.Y.	reversed
Kirk v. Smith ex rel. Penn	241 (1824)	Marshall	none	Johnson	C.C.D. Pa.	affirmed
Taylor v. Mason	325 (1824)	Marshall	none	none	C.C.D. Md.	affirmed
M'Creery's Lessee v. Somerville	354 (1824)	Story	none	none	C.C.D. Md.	affirmed
The Apollon	362 (1824)	Story	none	none	C.C.D. Ga.	multiple
The Emily and the Caroline	381 (1824)	Thompson	none	none	C.C.D.S.C.	affirmed
The Merino	391 (1824)	Washington	none	none	C.C.D. Ala.	multiple
The St. Jago	409 (1824)	Johnson	none	none	C.C.D. Md.	reversed
The Margaret	421 (1824)	Story	none	none	C.C.D. Md.	reversed
Two Hundred Chests of Tea	430 (1824)	Story	none	none	C.C.D. Mass.	reversed
Mason v. Muncaster	445 (1824)	Story	none	none	C.C.D.C.	affirmed
Doddridge v. Thompson	469 (1824)	Marshall	none	none	C.C.D. Ohio	reversed
Riggs v. Tayloe	483 (1824)	Todd	none	none	C.C.D.C.	reversed
Hughes v. Edwards	489 (1824)	Washington	none	none	C.C.D. Ky.	affirmed
Stephens v. McCargo	502 (1824)	Marshall	none	none	C.C.D. Ky.	affirmed
Love v. Simms's Lessee	515 (1824)	Johnson	none	none	C.C.D.W. Tenn.	reversed
Stewart v. Ingle	526 (1824)	Washington	none	none	C.C.D.C.	certiorari denied
Peyton v. Robertson	527 (1824)	Marshall	none	none	C.C.D.C.	dismissed
Ex parte Burr	529 (1824)	Marshall	none	none	C.C.D.C.	mandamus denied
Smith v. McIver	532 (1824)	Marshall	none	none	C.C.D.W. Tenn.	affirmed
Mullen v. Torrance	537 (1824)	Marshall	none	none	D. Miss.	reversed
Walker v. Turner	541 (1824)	Washington	none	none	C.C.D. Tenn.	reversed
Catlett v. Brodie	553 (1824)	Story	none	none	C.C.D.C.	conditionally dismissed
Baits v. Peters	556 (1824)	Marshall	none	none	D. Ala.	reversed
Sebree v. Dorr	558 (1824)	Story	none	none	C.C.D. Ky.	reversed
Kerr v. Moon's Devisees	565 (1824)	Washington	none	none	C.C.D. Ohio	reversed
Meredith v. Picket	573 (1824)	Marshall	none	none	C.C.D. Ky.	reversed
Walden ex rel. Denn v. Craig	576 (1824)	Marshall	none	none	C.C.D. Ky.	dismissed
United States v. Perez	579 (1824)	Story	none	none	C.C.S.D.N.Y.	certification
Renner v. Bank of Columbia	581 (1824)	Thompson	none	none	C.C.D.C.	affirmed
McGruder v. Bank of Washington	598 (1824)	Johnson	none	none	C.C.D.C.	affirmed
Ex parte Wood	603 (1824)	Story	none	none	C.C.S.D.N.Y.	mandamus issued
The Monte Allegre	616 (1824)	Thompson	none	none	D. Md.	affirmed
McIver v. Wattles	650 (1824)	Marshall	none	none	C.C.D.C.	dismissed
Walton v. United States	651 (1824)	Duvall	none	none	D. Miss.	affirmed
The Fanny	658 (1824)	Washington	none	none	C.C.D. Md.	reversed
Danforth v. Wear	673 (1824)	Johnson	none	none	C.C.D.W. Tenn.	reversed
Miller v. Stewart	680 (1824)	Story	none	Johnson	C.C.D. N.J.	certification
United States v. Kirkpatrick	720 (1824)	Story	none	none	W.D. Pa.	reversed
Osborn v. Bank of United States	738 (1824)	Marshall	none	Johnson	C.C.D. Ohio	multiple
Second Bank of the United States v. Planters' Bank	904 (1824)	Marshall	none	Johnson	C.C.D. Ga.	certification

== See also ==
- certificate of division
