= Fairfax's Devisee v. Hunter's Lessee =

- Supreme Court of the United States

Decided March 15, 1813
- Full case name: Fairfax's Devisee v. Hunter's Lessee
- Citations: 11 U.S. 603 (more) 7 Cranch 603; 3 L. Ed. 453

Holding
- The Virginia Court of Appeals was mistaken in denying the validity of the Fairfax land titles, the Virginia Court rejected the U.S. Supreme Court's mandate.

Court membership
- Chief Justice John Marshall Associate Justices Bushrod Washington · William Johnson; H. Brockholst Livingston · Thomas Todd; Gabriel Duvall · Joseph Story

Case opinions
- Majority: Story, joined by Livingston, Todd, Duvall
- Dissent: Johnson
- Marshall and Washington took no part in the consideration or decision of the case.

Fairfax's Devisee v. Hunter's Lessee, 11 U.S. (7 Cranch) 603 (1813), was a United States Supreme Court case arising out of the acquisition of lands originally granted by the British King Charles II (then in exile) in 1649 to Lord Fairfax in the Northern Neck and westward (all in what became the state of Virginia).

== Historical background ==
Basically, settlers who developed the once-forested Northern Neck Proprietary land into farms (and their heirs) for more than a century paid quitrents to the designated agent for Lord Fairfax's descendants. One complicating factor was that following King Charles II's restoration in 1660, he gave a group of merchants a different land grant in order to encourage settlement of the western frontier, but without disrupting Tidewater area lands already developed or claimed by others. Another problem was conflicting land grants issued by the Maryland colony--which extended only to the Appalachian Divide by its charter, whereas the Virginia grants had no western boundary. Furthermore, at the time the grants were made, essentially for lands between the Potomac and Rappahannock Rivers, surveys had not even proceeded westward to realize that the Rappahannock River arose after the confluence of two forks (as did the Potomac), so another dispute arose as to whether the Fairfax grant extended to the South Fork or ended at the North Fork of the Rappahannock. Various orders from successive Virginia governors and their councils did not resolve matters. In the 1730s, when "King Carter" was Lord Fairfax's agent in Virginia, Jost Hite and Isaac VanMeter brought 54 immigrant families from Pennsylvania and New York and sought to obtain title, eventually reaching an agreement with Lord Fairfax. Meanwhile, other German emigrants from Pennsylvania continued south past the Shenandoah Valley into North Carolina to avoid disputes after they developed farms. By 1745 the sixth Lord Fairfax, a bachelor, took a trip to the Virginia colony, settled there in 1747 and died at his Greenway Court hunting lodge in 1781. Lord Fairfax left most of his Virginia land to his nephew Denny Martin Fairfax, who did not want to leave England. Martin's younger brother, Thomas B. Martin, who had for years been trying to collect land rents from western settlers, and for whom Martinsburg, West Virginia would be named, received Greenway Court, where he died in 1792.

Immediately before the American Revolutionary War, one of Lord Fairfax's surveyors in western Virginia was Thomas Marshall, now better known as the father of Supreme Court justice John Marshall, and who at the time lived in central Virginia on part of Lord Fairfax' Leeds Manor tract, on land leased from Richard Henry Lee. Meanwhile, while not even surveying was complete for western acreage (and many surveys conflicted), considerable land even further west in Virginia claimed by Lord Fairfax's descendants had been cleared and developed by others, including the Hite and VanMeter families, who also supported the Patriot cause. Because of the complexity of the conveyances of Fairfax land prior to the acquisition, litigation was bound to arise, even in the absence of questions arising under the Peace Treaty.

Shortly after Lord Fairfax's death, the new Virginia legislature passed laws affecting his claims, and soon began sequestering quitrents stemming from the developed lands, and tried to settle the manor and undeveloped land controversies by confiscating lands because of his heir's presumed Loyalist sympathies. It relied on a common law rule that aliens could not inherit land, which would then escheat to the state. Virginia officials secured the Proprietary's land office books in 1785, and the following year under governor Patrick Henry began selling them to settlers.

While a young attorney, John Marshall represented Denny Martin Fairfax, and won a favorable decision from a Virginia court in Hite v. Fairfax (1786), which recognized Martin as Lord Fairfax's heir. It would be only the first of many legal cases relating to his inheritance, with this case which began in 1791 in the next round. While in England in 1792-1793, James Markham Marshall (the future chief justice's younger brother) agreed to buy the Fairfax family's claim to the Leeds Manor and South Branch tracts (which totaled 215,000 acres) from Martin for 20,000 pounds sterling, with closing scheduled for February 1, 1794. The Marshalls organized former Revolutionary War friends and relatives -- James and John Marshall, Lighthorse Harry Lee (later bought out by James Marshall) and Rawleigh Colston (husband of Elizabeth Marshall) -- who then needed to arrange financing. In fact, John Marshall had turned down both George Washington's offer to make him the Attorney General of the United States, and his temporary position as Attorney General of Virginia (since James Innes left the state) in order to pursue this land claim. The Marshalls' arrangement was initially financed by Robert Morris (whose daughter was James Marshall's wife), but he overextended himself in various speculations as became apparent in the Panic of 1797. Meanwhile, various county attorneys in Virginia pursued escheat actions against Fairfax in their county courts, and Virginia's legislature also reflected anti-British sentiments encouraging more actions. In 1794, the Frederick County judgment favoring the Commonwealth was quashed on a technicality, but separate Shenandoah and Fauquier County juries decided in the Commonwealth's favor.

== Litigation background ==
The litigation began in the Virginia District Court at Winchester, the county seat of vast Frederick County. In 1793, the parties arranged a test case with the objective of settling points of Virginia law. Trial judge St. George Tucker only ruled that Virginia had to initiate legal proceedings in a court in order to invoke the doctrine of escheat. Virginia appealed that decision to Virginia's highest court (then called the Supreme Court of Appeals and now the Virginia Supreme Court), but because Marshall had resigned as Attorney General, and Patrick Henry refused the case, the state hired John Wickham and Alexander Campbell (attorney), but the latter committed suicide by laudanum overdose before the appeal could be argued, further delaying matters.

Meanwhile, in 1795, Marshall filed a different (but related) lawsuit against David Hunter in the (new) United States Circuit Court. David Hunter had previously purchased a 788-acre parcel from the state of Virginia, then leased it to another man. Justice James Wilson and Judge Cyrus Griffin ruled in Fairfax's favor, but that case would not reach the U.S. Supreme Court until 1816.

The Marshalls were interested in getting good (saleable) title to the 215,000 acres that Fairfax owned personally, and the State of Virginia wanted to be able to resell approximately two million acres of still undeveloped land involved in the original royal grant. On December 10, 1796 the Virginia House of Delegates, with John Marshall as a member and Robert Andrews of Williamsburg advocating on behalf of those who held Fairfax land under conveyances from the state, passed compromise legislation. Robert Morris had suggested that legislation would help obtain loans from foreign sources. What was actually agreed to in the compromise was itself open to dispute, probably that upon obtaining the loan (and thus fulfilling the deal with Martin), the Marshall interests would retain interest in the 215,000 acres and convey the rest to the state. John Marshall seems to have believed in those years (the late 1790s) that the family was on legally solid ground based on the Treaty of Paris issue argued in the federal case.

The Marshall group finally consummated the deal with Denny Martin Fairfax on October 16, 1806, and after various exchanges with James Marshall and Rawleigh Colston, Marshall secured 50,000 acres of prime Virginia real estate.

== Case ==
The case reached the Supreme Court on "a writ of error to the Court of Appeals of Virginia (the original name of the Supreme Court of Virginia) in an action of ejectment involving the construction of the treaties between Great Britain and the United States, the judgment of the Court of Appeals being against the right claimed under those treaties." Because John Marshall had an interest in the proceeding, he recused himself.

Justice Joseph Story refused to accept, as final, the Virginia Court of Appeals' interpretation of Virginia law. He found that precedents in Virginia law itself upheld the Fairfax titles. Story's decision to "look into" Virginia law was a vital step in securing federal supremacy. Otherwise, the federal courts could be effectively blocked, by a state court's decision, from addressing a federal question— in this case a British national's rights under the treaties with Britain. The history of litigation prior to reaching the Supreme Court suggests that there was much for the Court to look into.

Justice Johnson dissented, arguing that the Virginia legislature acted within its rightful authority, when the Fairfax lands were sequestered without certain established procedures being followed.

== Aftermath ==
After the U.S. Supreme Court decided that the Virginia Court of Appeals was mistaken in denying the validity of the Fairfax land titles, the Virginia Court said the U.S. Supreme Court proceeding by writ of error was coram non judice and "improvidently allowed" under Section 25 of the Judiciary Act of 1789. They refused "obedience to its mandate". Martin v. Hunter's Lessee then came forward under a writ of error. Fairfax's Devisee is, however, significant in its own right.

== See also ==
- List of United States Supreme Court cases, volume 11
