= United States v. Perez =

United States v. Josef Perez
- Supreme Court of the United States

Decided March 17, 1824
- Full case name: The United States v. Josef Perez
- Citations: 22 U.S. 579 (more) 9 Wheat. 579; 6 L. Ed. 165

Case history
- Prior: United States v. Perez, 27 F. Cas. 504 (C.C.S.D.N.Y. 1823) (No. 16,033)

Holding
- Double jeopardy does not prevent a defendant from being retried after a hung jury.

Court membership
- Chief Justice John Marshall Associate Justices Bushrod Washington · William Johnson; Thomas Todd · Gabriel Duvall; Joseph Story · Smith Thompson

Case opinion
- Majority: Story, joined by unanimous

Laws applied
- Double Jeopardy Clause of the Fifth Amendment to the United States Constitution

United States v. Josef Perez, 22 U.S. (9 Wheat) 579 (1824), is a case of the Supreme Court of the United States. The decision held that when a criminal trial results in a hung jury, the Double Jeopardy Clause of the Fifth Amendment does not prevent the defendant from being retried.

== Background of the case ==
Josef Perez (born in 1800) was tried in 1822 for piracy—at that time a capital offense. Perez had been accused of boarding and robbing the schooner Bee as she was docked at San Juan de los Remedios, Cuba.

His trial originally resulted in a mistrial because the jury were unable to agree on a verdict. The judge dismissed the jury, and Perez' attorney claimed that Perez should be discharged since he had been tried once and not convicted.

== The decision ==
The Supreme Court held that courts should be cautious and exercise sound discretion in discharging a jury prior to a verdict. However, doing so does not bar retrial for the same offense. The Supreme Court declined to order Perez released from custody, and declared it fit to retry him on the original indictment.

== See also ==
- List of United States Supreme Court cases, volume 22
