= List of United States Supreme Court cases, volume 14 =

Supreme Court of the United States
- Interactive map of Supreme Court of the United States
- 38°53′26″N 77°00′16″W
- Established: March 4, 1789; 237 years ago
- Location: Washington, D.C.
- Coordinates: 38°53′26″N 77°00′16″W
- Composition method: Presidential nomination with Senate confirmation
- Authorised by: Constitution of the United States, Art. III, § 1
- Judge term length: life tenure, subject to impeachment and removal
- Number of positions: 9 (by statute)
- Website: supremecourt.gov

This is a list of cases reported in volume 14 (1 Wheat.) of United States Reports, decided by the Supreme Court of the United States in 1816.

== Nominative reports ==
In 1874, the U.S. government created the United States Reports, and retroactively numbered older privately published case reports as part of the new series. As a result, cases appearing in volumes 1–90 of U.S. Reports have dual citation forms; one for the volume number of U.S. Reports, and one for the volume number of the reports named for the relevant reporter of decisions (these are called "nominative reports").

=== Henry Wheaton ===
Starting with the 14th volume of U.S. Reports, the Reporter of Decisions of the Supreme Court of the United States was Henry Wheaton. Wheaton was Reporter of Decisions from 1816 to 1827, covering volumes 14 through 25 of United States Reports which correspond to volumes 1 through 12 of his Wheaton's Reports. As such, the dual form of citation to, for example, Martin v. Hunter's Lessee is 14 U.S. (1 Wheat.) 304 (1816).

== Justices of the Supreme Court at the time of 14 U.S. (1 Wheat.) ==
The Supreme Court is established by Article III, Section 1 of the Constitution of the United States, which says: "The judicial Power of the United States, shall be vested in one supreme Court . . .". The size of the Court is not specified; the Constitution leaves it to Congress to set the number of justices. Under the Judiciary Act of 1789 Congress originally fixed the number of justices at six (one chief justice and five associate justices). Since 1789 Congress has varied the size of the Court from six to seven, nine, ten, and back to nine justices (always including one chief justice).

When the cases in 14 U.S. (1 Wheat.) were decided, the Court comprised these seven justices:

Portrait	Justice	Office	Home State	Succeeded	Date confirmed by the Senate (Vote)	Tenure on Supreme Court
	John Marshall	Chief Justice	Virginia	Oliver Ellsworth	January 27, 1801 (Acclamation)	February 4, 1801 – July 6, 1835 (Died)
	Bushrod Washington	Associate Justice	Virginia	James Wilson	December 20, 1798 (Acclamation)	November 9, 1798 (Recess Appointment) – November 26, 1829 (Died)
	William Johnson	Associate Justice	South Carolina	Alfred Moore	March 24, 1804 (Acclamation)	May 7, 1804 – August 4, 1834 (Died)
	Henry Brockholst Livingston	Associate Justice	New York	William Paterson	December 17, 1806 (Acclamation)	January 20, 1807 – March 18, 1823 (Died)
	Thomas Todd	Associate Justice	Kentucky	new seat	March 2, 1807 (Acclamation)	March 3, 1807 – February 7, 1826 (Died)
	Gabriel Duvall	Associate Justice	Maryland	Samuel Chase	November 18, 1811 (Acclamation)	November 23, 1811 – January 12, 1835 (Resigned)
	Joseph Story	Associate Justice	Massachusetts	William Cushing	November 18, 1811 (Acclamation)	February 3, 1812 – September 10, 1845 (Died)

== Notable Case in 14 U.S. (1 Wheat.) ==
=== Martin v. Hunter's Lessee ===
Martin v. Hunter's Lessee, 14 U.S. (1 Wheat.) 304 (1816), was the first case to assert ultimate Supreme Court authority over state courts in civil matters of federal law.

== Citation style ==
Under the Judiciary Act of 1789 the federal court structure at the time comprised District Courts, which had general trial jurisdiction; Circuit Courts, which had mixed trial and appellate (from the US District Courts) jurisdiction; and the United States Supreme Court, which had appellate jurisdiction over the federal District and Circuit courts—and for certain issues over state courts. The Supreme Court also had limited original jurisdiction (i.e., in which cases could be filed directly with the Supreme Court without first having been heard by a lower federal or state court). There were one or more federal District Courts and/or Circuit Courts in each state, territory, or other geographical region.

Bluebook citation style is used for case names, citations, and jurisdictions.

- "C.C.D." = United States Circuit Court for the District of . . .
  - e.g.,"C.C.D.N.J." = United States Circuit Court for the District of New Jersey
- "D." = United States District Court for the District of . . .
  - e.g.,"D. Mass." = United States District Court for the District of Massachusetts
- "E." = Eastern; "M." = Middle; "N." = Northern; "S." = Southern; "W." = Western
  - e.g.,"C.C.S.D.N.Y." = United States Circuit Court for the Southern District of New York
  - e.g.,"M.D. Ala." = United States District Court for the Middle District of Alabama
- "Ct. Cl." = United States Court of Claims
- The abbreviation of a state's name alone indicates the highest appellate court in that state's judiciary at the time.
  - e.g.,"Pa." = Supreme Court of Pennsylvania
  - e.g.,"Me." = Supreme Judicial Court of Maine

== List of cases in 14 U.S. (1 Wheat.) ==
Case Name	Page and year	Opinion of the Court	Concurring opinion(s)	Dissenting opinion(s)	Lower Court	Disposition
Henry v. Ball	1 (1816)	Marshall	none	none	C.C.D.C.	affirmed
Davis v. Wood	6 (1816)	Marshall	none	none	not indicated	affirmed
The Samuel	9 (1816)	Marshall	none	none	C.C.D.R.I.	continued
The Octavia	20 (1816)	Story	none	none	C.C.D. Mass.	affirmed
The Mary and Susan I	25 (1816)	Marshall	none	none	C.C.D.N.Y.	affirmed
The Mary and Susan II	46 (1816)	Johnson	none	none	C.C.D.N.Y.	affirmed
The Rugen	62 (1816)	Livingston	none	none	C.C.D. Ga.	affirmed
Thompson v. Gray	75 (1816)	Marshall	none	none	C.C.D.C.	affirmed
Anderson v. Longden	85 (1816)	Marshall	none	none	C.C.D.C.	affirmed
City of New Orleans v. Winter	91 (1816)	Marshall	none	none	C.C.D. La.	reversed
The Aurora	96 (1816)	Story	none	none	C.C.D. Pa.	affirmed
The Venus	112 (1816)	Story	Marshall	none	C.C.D. Ga.	certification
Preston v. Browder	115 (1816)	Todd	none	none	C.C.D.E. Tenn.	affirmed
The Astrea	125 (1816)	Marshall	none	none	C.C.D. Ga.	affirmed
Matson v. Hord	130 (1816)	Marshall	none	none	C.C.D. Ky.	affirmed
Taylor v. Walton	141 (1816)	Marshall	none	none	C.C.D. Ky.	reversed
Barr v. Lapsley	151 (1816)	Johnson	none	none	C.C.D.C.	affirmed
Danforth's Lessee v. Thomas	155 (1816)	Todd	none	none	C.C.D.E. Tenn.	affirmed
The Antonia Johanna	159 (1816)	Story	none	none	C.C.D.N.C.	affirmed
The Nereid	171 (1816)	Marshall	none	none	C.C.S.D.N.Y.	certification
Hepburn v. Dunlop and Company	179 (1816)	Washington	none	none	C.C.D.C.	reversed
The St. Joze	208 (1816)	Story	none	none	C.C.D. Mass.	affirmed
Renner v. Marshall	215 (1816)	Story	none	none	C.C.D.C.	affirmed
Morean v. United States Insurance Company	219 (1816)	Washington	none	none	C.C.D. Pa.	affirmed
Welch v. Mandeville	233 (1816)	Story	none	none	C.C.D.C.	reversed
L'Invincible	238 (1816)	Johnson	none	none	C.C.D. Mass.	affirmed
The Edward	261 (1816)	Washington	none	Livingston	C.C.D. Mass.	affirmed
Mutual Assurance Society v. Watt's Executors	279 (1816)	Johnson	none	none	C.C.D.C.	reversed
Walden v. Gratz's Heirs	292 (1816)	Marshall	none	none	C.C.D. Ky.	reversed
The Harrison	298 (1816)	Story	none	none	C.C.D. Md.	certification
Harden v. Fisher	300 (1816)	Marshall	none	none	C.C.D.N.Y.	reversed
Martin v. Hunter's Lessee	304 (1816)	Story	Johnson	none	Va.	affirmed
The Commercen	382 (1816)	Story	Marshall; Livingston; Johnson	none	C.C.D. Mass.	affirmed
The George	408 (1816)	Marshall	none	none	C.C.D. Mass.	certification
United States v. Coolidge	415 (1816)	Johnson	none	none	C.C.D. Mass.	certification
The St. Nicholas	417 (1816)	Johnson	none	none	C.C.D. Ga.	multiple
Russel v. Transylvania University	432 (1816)	Johnson	none	none	C.C.D. Ky.	affirmed
The Elsineur	439 (1816)	per curiam	none	none	C.C.D. Ga.	certification
The Hiram	440 (1816)	Marshall	none	none	C.C.D. Mass.	affirmed
Ammidon v. Smith	447 (1816)	Marshall	none	none	C.C.D.R.I.	certification
Jones v. Shore's Executors	462 (1816)	Story	none	none	C.C.D. Va.	certification
Patton's Lessee v. Easton	476 (1816)	Marshall	none	none	C.C.D.W. Tenn.	certification
Ross v. Reed	482 (1816)	Todd	none	none	C.C.D.E. Tenn.	affirmed

== See also ==
- certificate of division
