= The Schooner Exchange v. McFaddon =

- Supreme Court of the United States

Decided February 24, 1812
- Full case name: The Schooner Exchange v. McFaddon & Others
- Citations: 11 U.S. 116 (more) 7 Cranch 116; 3 L. Ed. 287

Case history
- Prior: McFadden v. the Exchange, 16 F. Cas. 85 (C.C.D. Pa. 1811)

Holding
- American courts do not have jurisdiction over a friendly nation's military vessel that enters an American port.

Court membership
- Chief Justice John Marshall Associate Justices Bushrod Washington · William Johnson; H. Brockholst Livingston · Thomas Todd; Gabriel Duvall · Joseph Story

Case opinion
- Majority: Marshall, joined by unanimous

The Schooner Exchange v. McFaddon, 11 U.S. (7 Cranch) 116 (1812), is a United States Supreme Court case on the jurisdiction of federal courts over a claim against a friendly foreign military vessel visiting an American port. The court interpreted customary international law to determine that there was no jurisdiction.

== Background ==
The schooner Exchange, owned by John McFaddon and William Greetham, sailed from Baltimore, Maryland, on October 27, 1809, for San Sebastián, Spain. On December 30, 1810, the Exchange was seized by order of Napoleon Bonaparte. The Exchange was then armed and commissioned as a French warship, under the name of Balaou. When the vessel later docked in Philadelphia because of storm damage, McFaddon and Greetham filed an action in the United States Court for the District of Pennsylvania to seize the vessel, claiming that it had been taken illegally. The district court found that it did not have jurisdiction over the dispute. On appeal, the Circuit Court for the District of Pennsylvania reversed the decision of the district court and ordered the district court to proceed to the merits of the case.

== Decision ==
The Supreme Court reversed the circuit court's decision and affirmed the district court's dismissal of the action.

Chief Justice Marshall delivered the opinion of the Supreme Court. He noted that by the definition of sovereignty, a state has absolute and exclusive jurisdiction within its own territory but it could also, by implied or express consent, waive jurisdiction. Moreover, Marshall also noted that, under customary international law, jurisdiction was presumed to be waived in a number of situations.

For instance, visiting foreign sovereigns and their diplomatic representatives were generally free from the jurisdiction of domestic courts. Similarly, a state granting permission for a foreign army free passage across its territory generally implied a waiver of jurisdiction over that army. That custom was established so firmly and necessarily for international relations that it would be wrongful for a country to violate it without prior notice.

Marshall further noted that while the right of free passage by an army usually had to be explicitly granted, by maritime custom a nation's ports were presumptively open to all friendly ships. While a nation could close its ports to the warships of another country, it would have to issue some form of declaration to do so. Without such a declaration, a friendly foreign warship could enter a nation's port with its implied consent. Marshall further distinguished between private merchant ships and citizens, who are subject to a nation's jurisdiction when they enter its ports with the nation's implied consent, and military ships. Namely, private ships do not carry with them the sovereign status of military ships and the privileges that accompany it.

Therefore, Marshall concluded that "a principle of public [international] law [is] that national ships of war, entering the port of a friendly power open for their reception, are to be considered as exempted by the consent of that power from its jurisdiction."

Applying that analysis to the facts at hand, Marshall found that the courts did not have jurisdiction over the case.

== Significance ==
The decision is regarded as the "first definitive statement of the doctrine of foreign state immunity." Also, the unwillingness of the Court to find jurisdiction without action by the political branches of government, along with some explicit dicta, led to a tradition of great deference by the courts to official and individual determinations of immunity by the US State Department. That system was not revised in favor of judicial interpretations until the passage of the Foreign Sovereign Immunities Act in 1976.

== See also ==
- List of United States Supreme Court cases, volume 11

== Sources ==
- Reeves, J. S. (1924). "A Note on Exchange v. McFaddon". American Journal of International Law. 18 (2): 320. doi:10.2307/2188402. JSTOR 2188402.
