= List of United States Supreme Court cases, volume 11 =

Supreme Court of the United States
- Interactive map of Supreme Court of the United States
- 38°53′26″N 77°00′16″W
- Established: March 4, 1789; 237 years ago
- Location: Washington, D.C.
- Coordinates: 38°53′26″N 77°00′16″W
- Composition method: Presidential nomination with Senate confirmation
- Authorised by: Constitution of the United States, Art. III, § 1
- Judge term length: life tenure, subject to impeachment and removal
- Number of positions: 9 (by statute)
- Website: supremecourt.gov

This is a list of cases reported in volume 11 (7 Cranch) of United States Reports, decided by the Supreme Court of the United States in 1812 and 1813.

== Nominative reports ==
In 1874, the U.S. government created the United States Reports, and retroactively numbered older privately published case reports as part of the new series. As a result, cases appearing in volumes 1–90 of U.S. Reports have dual citation forms; one for the volume number of U.S. Reports, and one for the volume number of the reports named for the relevant reporter of decisions (these are called "nominative reports").

=== William Cranch ===
Starting with the 5th volume of U.S. Reports, the Reporter of Decisions of the Supreme Court of the United States was William Cranch. Cranch was Reporter of Decisions from 1801 to 1815, covering volumes 5 through 13 of United States Reports which correspond to volumes 1 through 9 of his Cranch's Reports. As such, the dual form of citation to, for example, Wells v. United States is 11 U.S. (7 Cranch) 22 (1812).

== Justices of the Supreme Court at the time of 11 U.S. (7 Cranch) ==
The Supreme Court is established by Article III, Section 1 of the Constitution of the United States, which says: "The judicial Power of the United States, shall be vested in one supreme Court . . .". The size of the Court is not specified; the Constitution leaves it to Congress to set the number of justices. Under the Judiciary Act of 1789 Congress originally fixed the number of justices at six (one chief justice and five associate justices). Since 1789 Congress has varied the size of the Court from six to seven, nine, ten, and back to nine justices (always including one chief justice).

When the cases in 11 U.S. (7 Cranch) were decided, the Court comprised these seven justices:

Portrait	Justice	Office	Home State	Succeeded	Date confirmed by the Senate (Vote)	Tenure on Supreme Court
	John Marshall	Chief Justice	Virginia	Oliver Ellsworth	January 27, 1801 (Acclamation)	February 4, 1801 – July 6, 1835 (Died)
	Bushrod Washington	Associate Justice	Virginia	James Wilson	December 20, 1798 (Acclamation)	November 9, 1798 (Recess Appointment) – November 26, 1829 (Died)
	William Johnson	Associate Justice	South Carolina	Alfred Moore	March 24, 1804 (Acclamation)	May 7, 1804 – August 4, 1834 (Died)
	Henry Brockholst Livingston	Associate Justice	New York	William Paterson	December 17, 1806 (Acclamation)	January 20, 1807 – March 18, 1823 (Died)
	Thomas Todd	Associate Justice	Kentucky	new seat	March 2, 1807 (Acclamation)	March 3, 1807 – February 7, 1826 (Died)
	Gabriel Duvall	Associate Justice	Maryland	Samuel Chase	November 18, 1811 (Acclamation)	November 23, 1811 – January 12, 1835 (Resigned)
	Joseph Story	Associate Justice	Massachusetts	William Cushing	November 18, 1811 (Acclamation)	February 3, 1812 – September 10, 1845 (Died)

== Notable cases in 11 U.S. (7 Cranch) ==
=== United States v. Hudson ===
In United States v. Hudson, 11 U.S. (7 Cranch) 32 (1812), the Court held that Congress must first enact a constitutional law criminalizing an activity, attach a penalty, and give the federal courts jurisdiction over the offense for a federal court to render a conviction.

=== The Schooner Exchange v. M'Faddon ===
In The Schooner Exchange v. McFaddon, 11 U.S. (7 Cranch) 116 (1812), the Court considered the jurisdiction of federal courts over a claim against a friendly foreign military vessel visiting an American port. The court interpreted customary international law to determine that there was no federal jurisdiction.

=== Fairfax's Devisee v. Hunter's Lessee ===
Fairfax's Devisee v. Hunter's Lessee, 11 U.S. (7 Cranch) 603 (1813), was a case arising out of the acquisition of land in Virginia. For the Court, Justice Joseph Story refused to accept as final the Virginia Court of Appeals' interpretation of Virginia law. He found that precedents in Virginia law itself upheld the titles in question. Story's decision to "look into" Virginia law was a vital step in securing federal supremacy. Otherwise, the federal courts could be effectively blocked, by a state court's decision, from addressing a federal question — in this case a British national's rights under treaties with Britain.

=== Queen v. Hepburn ===
Queen v. Hepburn, 11 U.S. (7 Cranch) 290 (1813), was a case in which a Maryland slave sued for her freedom. In support of her claim, her attorney offered several depositions containing testimony favorable to her. Chief Justice Marshall, who was a slave-owner, affirmed the lower court's judgment against the woman on the basis that the deposition statements were hearsay, and so were properly excluded from evidence. Dissenting, Justice Gabriel Duvall of Maryland, although also a slave-owner, pointed out that under Maryland law certain hearsay can legitimately be admitted to establish land boundaries, and that hearsay in cases involving freedom should be admitted as well.

Duvall wrote:

"It appears to me that the reason for admitting hearsay evidence upon a question of freedom is much stronger than in cases of . . . the boundaries of land. It will be universally admitted that the right to freedom is more important than the right of property. And people of color from their helpless condition under the uncontrolled authority of a master, are entitled to all reasonable protection. A decision that hearsay evidence in such cases shall not be admitted, cuts up by the roots all claims of the kind, and puts a final end to them, unless the claim should arise from a fact of recent date, and such a case will seldom, perhaps never, occur."

== Citation style ==
Under the Judiciary Act of 1789 the federal court structure at the time comprised District Courts, which had general trial jurisdiction; Circuit Courts, which had mixed trial and appellate (from the US District Courts) jurisdiction; and the United States Supreme Court, which had appellate jurisdiction over the federal District and Circuit courts—and for certain issues over state courts. The Supreme Court also had limited original jurisdiction (i.e., in which cases could be filed directly with the Supreme Court without first having been heard by a lower federal or state court). There were one or more federal District Courts and/or Circuit Courts in each state, territory, or other geographical region.

Bluebook citation style is used for case names, citations, and jurisdictions.

- "C.C.D." = United States Circuit Court for the District of . . .
  - e.g.,"C.C.D.N.J." = United States Circuit Court for the District of New Jersey
- "D." = United States District Court for the District of . . .
  - e.g.,"D. Mass." = United States District Court for the District of Massachusetts
- "E." = Eastern; "M." = Middle; "N." = Northern; "S." = Southern; "W." = Western
  - e.g.,"C.C.S.D.N.Y." = United States Circuit Court for the Southern District of New York
  - e.g.,"M.D. Ala." = United States District Court for the Middle District of Alabama
- "Ct. Cl." = United States Court of Claims
- The abbreviation of a state's name alone indicates the highest appellate court in that state's judiciary at the time.
  - e.g.,"Pa." = Supreme Court of Pennsylvania
  - e.g.,"Me." = Supreme Judicial Court of Maine

== List of cases in 11 U.S. (7 Cranch) ==
Case Name	Page and year	Opinion of the Court	Concurring opinion(s)	Dissenting opinion(s)	Lower Court	Disposition
Hudson v. Guestier	1 (1812)	per curiam	none	none	C.C.D.C.	affirmed
Fitzsimmons v. Ogden	2 (1812)	Washington	none	none	C.C.D.N.Y.	affirmed
The Brig James Wells	22 (1812)	Washington	none	none	C.C.D. Conn.	affirmed
Maryland Insurance Company v. Le Roy	26 (1812)	Johnson	none	none	C.C.D. Md.	reversed
United States v. Hudson	32 (1812)	Johnson	none	none	C.C.D. Conn.	certification
Shirras v. Caig	34 (1812)	Marshall	none	none	C.C.D. Ga.	certification
Schooner Paulina	52 (1812)	Marshall	Johnson	Johnson	C.C.D.R.I.	reversed
Russell v. Clark's Executors	69 (1812)	Marshall	none	none	C.C.D.R.I.	reversed
Bingham v. Morris	99 (1812)	per curiam	none	none	not indicated	overruled
Catherine v. United States	99 (1812)	per curiam	none	none	not indicated	dismissed
The Sloop Active	100 (1812)	Marshall	none	none	C.C.D. Conn.	reversed
Hawthorne v. United States	107 (1812)	Marshall	none	none	D. Orleans	commission granted
United States v. Goodwin	108 (1812)	Washington	none	none	C.C.D. Pa.	dismissed
Whelan v. United States	112 (1812)	per curiam	none	none	D. Pa.	dismissed
The Brig Eliza	113 (1812)	Marshall	none	none	C.C.D. Del.	certification
United States v. Crosby	115 (1812)	Story	none	none	C.C.D. Mass.	affirmed
The Schooner Exchange	116 (1812)	Marshall	none	none	C.C.D. Pa.	reversed
Freeland v. Heron Lenox and Company	147 (1812)	Duvall	none	none	C.C.D. Va.	reversed
Welch v. Mandeville	152 (1812)	Marshall	none	none	C.C.D.C.	affirmed
Marsteller v. M'Clean	156 (1812)	Story	none	none	C.C.D.C.	affirmed
Welch v. Lindo	159 (1812)	Marshall	none	none	C.C.D.C.	affirmed
New Jersey v. Wilson	164 (1812)	Marshall	none	none	N.J.	reversed
King v. Riddle	168 (1812)	Marshall	none	none	C.C.D.C.	affirmed
Davy's Executors v. Faw	171 (1812)	Marshall	none	none	C.C.D.C.	reversed
Hughes v. Moore	176 (1812)	Marshall	none	none	C.C.D.C.	reversed
Barton v. Petit	194 (1812)	Washington	none	none	C.C.D. Va.	reversed
Wilson v. Koontz	202 (1812)	Marshall	none	none	C.C.D.C.	affirmed
Riddle v. Moss	206 (1812)	Marshall	none	none	C.C.D.C.	reversed
Sheehy v. Mandeville	208 (1812)	Marshall	none	none	C.C.D.C.	affirmed
Conway's Executors v. Alexander	218 (1812)	Marshall	none	none	C.C.D.C.	reversed
Dunlop v. Munroe	242 (1812)	Johnson	none	none	C.C.D.C.	affirmed
Wood v. Davis	271 (1812)	Marshall	none	none	C.C.D.C.	reversed
Morgan v. Reintzel	273 (1812)	Marshall	none	none	C.C.D.C.	affirmed
Caldwell v. Jackson	276 (1812)	Marshall	none	none	not indicated	rule absolute
Wise and Lynn v. Columbian Turnpike Company	276 (1812)	per curiam	none	none	not indicated	dismissed
Blackwell v. Patten	277 (1812)	per curiam	none	none	not indicated	dismissal denied
Wallen v. Williams	278 (1812)	Todd	Marshall	none	C.C.D. Tenn.	overruled
M'Kim v. Voorhies	279 (1812)	Todd	none	none	C.C.D. Ky.	certification
Beatty v. Maryland	281 (1812)	Duvall	Marshall	none	C.C.D.C.	affirmed
United States v. Tyler	285 (1812)	Livingston	none	none	C.C.D. Vt.	certification
United States v. Gordon	287 (1813)	per curiam	none	none	C.C.D. Va.	dismissed
Barton v. Petit	288 (1813)	Washington	none	none	C.C.D. Va.	reversed
Queen v. Hepburn	290 (1813)	Marshall	none	Duvall	C.C.D.C.	affirmed
Bank of Columbia v. Patterson's Administrator	299 (1813)	Story	none	none	C.C.D.C.	affirmed
Clark's Executors v. Carrington	308 (1813)	Marshall	none	none	C.C.D.R.I.	affirmed
Dickey v. Baltimore Insurance Company	327 (1813)	Marshall	none	none	C.C.D. Md.	reversed
Marine Insurance Company v. Hodgson	332 (1813)	Marshall	none	none	C.C.D.C.	affirmed
Locke v. United States	339 (1813)	Marshall	none	none	C.C.D. Md.	affirmed
The Schooner Good Catharine	349 (1813)	per curiam	none	none	C.C.D. Md.	affirmed
Bond v. Jay	350 (1813)	Marshall	none	none	C.C.D. Md.	reversed
Preston v. Tremble	354 (1813)	Marshall	none	none	C.C.D.E. Tenn.	affirmed
The Brig Penobscot	356 (1813)	Marshall	none	none	C.C.D. Ga.	affirmed
Caze v. Baltimore Insurance Company	358 (1813)	Story	none	none	C.C.D. Md.	affirmed
The Schooner Jane	363 (1813)	Washington	none	none	C.C.D. Md.	affirmed
Lee v. Munroe	366 (1813)	Livingston	none	none	C.C.D.C.	affirmed
Herbert v. Wren	370 (1813)	Marshall	none	Johnson	C.C.D.C.	reversed
The Brig Aurora	382 (1813)	Johnson	none	none	D. Orleans	reversed
The Schooner Hoppet	389 (1813)	Marshall	none	none	D. Orleans	multiple
Mutual Assurance Society v. Korn	396 (1813)	Johnson	none	none	C.C.D.C.	reversed
Webster v. Hoban	399 (1813)	Livingston	none	none	C.C.D.C.	affirmed
Maryland Insurance Company v. Wood	402 (1813)	Livingston	none	none	C.C.D. Md.	affirmed
Ferguson v. Harwood	408 (1813)	Story	none	none	C.C.D.C.	affirmed
Biays v. Chesapeake Insurance Company	415 (1813)	Livingston	none	none	C.C.D. Md.	affirmed
Stark v. Chesapeake Insurance Company	420 (1813)	per curiam	none	none	C.C.D. Md.	reversed
Williams v. Armroyd	423 (1813)	Marshall	none	none	C.C.D. Pa.	affirmed
Smith v. Delaware Insurance Company	434 (1813)	Marshall	none	none	C.C.D. Md.	reversed
Holker v. Parker	436 (1813)	Marshall	none	none	C.C.D. Mass.	reversed
Barnitz's Lessee v. Casey	456 (1813)	Story	none	none	C.C.D. Md.	affirmed
Blackwell v. Patton's Lessee	471 (1813)	Marshall	none	none	C.C.D.W. Tenn.	affirmed
Mills v. Duryee	481 (1813)	Story	none	Johnson	C.C.D.C.	affirmed
Oliver v. Maryland Insurance Company	487 (1813)	Marshall	Livingston, Story	none	C.C.D. Md.	affirmed
The Brig Caroline	496 (1813)	per curiam	none	none	C.C.D.S.C.	reversed
Riggs v. Lindsay	500 (1813)	Livingston	none	none	C.C.D.C.	affirmed
M'Intire v. Wood	504 (1813)	Johnson	none	none	C.C.D. Ohio	reversed
Livingston v. Maryland Insurance Company	506 (1813)	Marshall	Story	none	C.C.D. Md.	reversed
Young v. Grundy	548 (1813)	Livingston	none	none	C.C.D.C.	affirmed
Palmer v. Allen	550 (1813)	Johnson	none	none	Conn.	reversed
Young v. Black	565 (1813)	Story	Livingston; Johnson; Marshall	none	C.C.D.C.	reversed
The Schooner Anne	570 (1813)	Marshall	none	none	C.C.D.S.C.	reversed
United States v. January	572 (1813)	Duvall	none	none	C.C.D. Ky.	reversed
United States v. Patterson	575 (1813)	Duvall	none	none	C.C.D. Ky.	reversed
Livingston v. Dorgenois	577 (1813)	per curiam	none	none	D. Orleans	mandamus granted
Otis v. Bacon	589 (1813)	Washington	none	none	Mass.	affirmed
Thornton v. Carson	596 (1813)	Washington	none	none	C.C.D.C.	affirmed
Wallen v. Williams	602 (1813)	per curiam	none	none	C.C.D.E. Tenn.	reversed
Fairfax's Devisee v. Hunter's Lessee	603 (1813)	Story	none	Johnson	Va.	reversed

== See also ==
- certificate of division
