= United States v. Hudson =

United States v. Hudson and Goodwin
- Supreme Court of the United States

Decided February 13, 1812
- Full case name: United States v. Barzillai Hudson and George Goodwin
- Citations: 11 U.S. 32 (more) 11 Cranch 32; 3 L. Ed. 259; 1812 U.S. LEXIS 365

Case history
- Prior: On certiorari from the Circuit Court for the District of Connecticut

Holding
- The lower federal courts have no jurisdiction in criminal cases unless Congress has designated an act to be a crime, attached a penalty, and granted jurisdiction.

Court membership
- Chief Justice John Marshall Associate Justices Bushrod Washington · William Johnson; H. Brockholst Livingston · Thomas Todd; Gabriel Duvall · Joseph Story

Case opinion
- Majority: Johnson, joined by Marshall, Livingston, Todd, Duvall, Story
- Washington took no part in the consideration or decision of the case.

Laws applied
- U.S. Const. art. III

United States v. Hudson and Goodwin, 11 U.S. (7 Cranch) 32 (1812), was a case in which the United States Supreme Court held that Congress must first enact a constitutional law criminalizing an activity, attach a penalty, and give the federal courts jurisdiction over the offense in order for the court to render a conviction. In other words, there is no federal common law of crimes.

== Facts ==
Barzillai Hudson and George Goodwin, the defendants in the case, were charged with a libel on the President and Congress, and of having accused them of secretly voting to give Napoleon Bonaparte $2 million to make a treaty with Spain. The circuit court was divided on whether it could exercise common law jurisdiction over such cases.

== Decision ==
Justice William Johnson, Jr. delivered the opinion of the Court. He first explained that the federal government is one of limited powers, as set forth in the Constitution. Furthermore, only the jurisdiction of the Supreme Court was explicitly defined in Article III of the U.S. Constitution. Since the lower federal courts were created by Congress with the Judiciary Act of 1789, their jurisdiction had to be defined by Congress. Therefore, the Court reasoned that since Congress has the power to create such courts, the principles of limited government militate in favor of limiting their jurisdiction to specific acts specified by Congress.

The Court held, "The legislative authority of the Union must first make an act a crime, affix a punishment to it, and declare the Court that shall have jurisdiction of the offence." In dicta, he also mentioned an exception to the general rule: courts have some implied powers, such as punishing litigants for contumacy (contempt of court) and enforcing court orders.

== Impact ==
The case effectively closed the door on the lower federal courts' powers to convict defendants for common law crimes and mandated Congress to define criminal jurisdiction specifically, through legislation.

== See also ==
- List of United States Supreme Court cases, volume 11

== Notes and references ==
- Gary D. Rowe, The Sound of Silence: United States v. Hudson & Goodwin, the Jeffersonian Ascendancy, and the Abolition of Federal Common Law Crimes, 101 Yale L.J. 919 (1992).
