= Queen v. Hepburn =

- Supreme Court of the United States

Argued February 5, 1813 Decided February 13, 1813
- Full case name: Mima Queen and Child, petitioners for freedom v. Hepburn
- Citations: 11 U.S. 290 (more) 7 Cranch 290, 3 L. Ed. 348, 1813 U.S. LEXIS 417
- Argument: Oral argument
- Opinion announcement: Opinion announcement

Case history
- Prior: Judgment for the Defendant in Mima and Louisa Queen v. John Hepburn, 2 Cranch C.C. 3, 20 F.Cas. 130, 2 D.C. 3, No. 11,503 (C.C.D.D.C. 1810).

Holding
- Judgment Affirmed

Court membership
- Chief Justice John Marshall Associate Justices Bushrod Washington · William Johnson; H. Brockholst Livingston · Thomas Todd; Gabriel Duvall · Joseph Story

Case opinions
- Majority: John Marshall
- Dissent: Gabriel Duvall

Laws applied
- Hearsay Rule

Mima Queen and Child v. Hepburn, 11 U.S. (7 Cranch) 290 (1813), was a United States Supreme Court case, affirming a denial of a petition for freedom. By refusing to create a new exception to the hearsay rule, which would admit second-hand testimony of an ancestor's freedom into evidence, the case had important implications for the law of evidence and the American antislavery movement.

== Background ==
Lord Mansfield's historic ruling in Somerset's Case (1772) implied to some lawyers and judges in America that an enslaved person who entered England became free. In their freedom petition, the Queens as plaintiffs relied on hearsay evidence that their ancestor, Mary Queen, had been free by virtue of having been in England before arriving in America, where she was later sold for a term of seven years (perhaps as an indentured servant); this evidence was meant to show that, though they were currently claimed as slaves, the Queens actually descended from a free woman. Francis Scott Key was the Queens' attorney in their freedom suit.

== Supreme Court decision ==
=== Majority Opinion of Chief Justice John Marshall ===
In ruling the hearsay evidence of the Queens' family history inadmissible and refusing to create a new federal exception to the hearsay rule, John Marshall's majority opinion applied federal common law instead of the state law of Maryland, which had recognized the hearsay as admissible and on which the Queens had relied in the lower courts. Marshall asserted that all evidentiary controversies in the case

...depend on one general principle. The decision of which determines them all. It is this: That hearsay evidence is incompetent to establish any specific fact, which fact is in its nature susceptable [sic] of being proved by witnesses who speak from their own knowledge. However the feelings of the individual may be interested on the part of a person claiming freedom, the Court cannot perceive any legal distinction between the assertion of this and of any other right, which will justify the application of a rule of evidence to cases of this description which would be inapplicable to general cases in which a right to property may be asserted. The rule then which the Court shall establish in this cause will not, in its application, be confined to cases of this particular description, but will be extended to others where rights may depend on facts which happened many years past.

After describing the rule that hearsay is inadmissible as evidence, Marshall continued:

To this rule there are some exceptions which are said to be as old as the rule itself. These are cases of pedigree, of prescription, of custom, and in some cases of boundary. There are also matters of general and public history which may be received without that full proof which is necessary for the establishment of a private fact.

Marshall did not believe these exceptions applied to the Queens' case, and refused to create a new exception that would vindicate their petition for freedom, writing:

The danger of admitting hearsay evidence is sufficient to admonish Courts of justice against lightly yielding to the introduction of fresh exceptions to an old and well established rule: the value of which is felt and acknowledged by all.

If the circumstance that the eye witnesses of any fact be dead should justify the introduction of testimony to establish that fact from hearsay, no man could feel safe in any property, a claim to which might be supported by proof so easily obtained.

[...] The general rule comprehends the case, and the case is not within any exception heretofore recognized. This Court is not inclined to extend the exceptions further than they have already been carried.

Marshall also wrote that the lower court had ruled correctly in disqualifying jurors for holding antislavery opinions, asserting that jurors should be neutral about such questions and that "it was desirable to submit the case to those who felt no bias either way."

=== Dissent of Justice Gabriel Duvall ===
The lone dissent was from Associate Justice Gabriel Duvall, who, in addition to having previously served in Congress and as the Chief Judge of the General Court of Maryland, had once worked as an attorney for various Queen family members' freedom suits in the 1790s. In his dissent, Duvall argued against the majority's refusal to create a new federal common law hearsay exception that would vindicate the plaintiffs' natural right to freedom:

Hearsay evidence was admitted [in comparable cases in Maryland] upon the same principle, upon which it is admitted to prove a custom, pedigree and the boundaries of land; because from the antiquity of the transactions to which these subjects may have reference, it is impossible to produce living testimony. To exclude hearsay in such cases, would leave the party interested without remedy. It was decided also that the issue could not be prejudiced by the neglect or omission of the ancestor. If the ancestor neglected to claim her right, the issue could not be bound by length of time, it being a natural inherent right. It appears to me that the reason for admitting hearsay evidence upon a question of freedom is much stronger than in cases of pedigree or in controversies relative to the boundaries of land. It will be universally admitted that the right to freedom is more important than the right of property. And people of color from their helpless condition under the uncontrolled authority of a master, are entitled to all reasonable protection. A decision that hearsay evidence in such cases shall not be admitted, cuts up by the roots all claims of the kind, and puts a final end to them, unless the claim should arise from a fact of recent date, and such a case will seldom, perhaps never, occur.

== Impact ==
=== Effect on Freedom Suits ===
The case quickly became a precedent to deny other similar petitions for freedom, much as Justice Duvall had feared. Extending and applying the case's logic in other suits and appeals during the ensuing years, by the 1830s "[t]he courts had effectively put an end to freedom suits brought by people claiming their liberty based on descent."

=== Influence on the Law of Evidence ===
Queen v. Hepburn has been characterized by one evidence scholar as "probably the most widely cited American hearsay case of the early nineteenth century." Marshall's majority opinion went on to be cited by Simon Greenleaf's influential evidence treatise and by numerous judicial opinions in cases continuing into the twenty-first century, both as authority establishing the inherent weakness of hearsay evidence and for the conclusion that courts should not create new exceptions to the hearsay rule.
