= Osborn v. Bank of the United States =

- Supreme Court of the United States

Argued March 10, 1824 Decided March 19, 1824
- Full case name: Ralph Osborn and others, Appellants v. The President, Directors, and Company of the Bank of the United States, Respondents
- Citations: 22 U.S. 738 (more) 9 Wheat. 738; 6 L. Ed. 204; 1824 U.S. LEXIS 409

Case history
- Prior: Appeal from the Circuit Court of Ohio

Holding
- The Eleventh Amendment is inapplicable in suits in which a state is not a party of record even if a party is acting as a state official.

Court membership
- Chief Justice John Marshall Associate Justices Bushrod Washington · William Johnson; Thomas Todd · Gabriel Duvall; Joseph Story · Smith Thompson

Case opinions
- Majority: Marshall, joined by Washington, Todd, Duvall, Story, Thompson
- Dissent: Johnson

Laws applied
- Eleventh Amendment

Osborn v. Bank of the United States, 22 U.S. (9 Wheat.) 738 (1824), was a case set in the Banking Crisis of 1819, when many banks, including the Second Bank of the United States, demanded repayment for loans that they had issued on credit that they did not have. That led to an economic downturn and a shortage of money. In 1819, Ohio passed a law that put a tax on the Bank of the United States on the theory that taxing the bank would allow the state government to receive and distribute the scarce money.

On September 17, 1819, Ohio Auditor Ralph Osborn was given permission to seize $100,000 from a branch of the Bank of the United States. However, his agents mistakenly took $120,000 although the extra $20,000 was promptly returned. The bank chose to sue Osborn for the return of the additional $100,000, and a federal court ruled that Osborn had violated a court order, prohibiting the taxing of the bank.

Osborn argued that he had never been properly served with the order but still had to return the money. A problem arose when Osborn could pay back only $98,000, as the other $2,000 had been used to pay the salary of Osborn's tax agents.

In 1824, the Supreme Court ruled in favor of the Bank of the United States and ordered the return of the disputed $2,000.

== See also ==
- List of United States Supreme Court cases, volume 22
