= Martin v. Hunter's Lessee =

- Supreme Court of the United States

Argued March 12, 1816 Decided March 20, 1816
- Full case name: Martin, Heir at law and devisee of Fairfax v. Hunter's Lessee
- Citations: 14 U.S. 304 (more) 1 Wheat. 304; 4 L. Ed. 97; 1816 U.S. LEXIS 333

Case history
- Prior: Judgment for defendant, Hunter v. Fairfax's Devisee, Winchester District Court; reversed, 15 Va. 218 (1810); reversed, sub nom. Fairfax's Devisee v. Hunter's Lessee, 11 U.S. 603 (1813); on remand, sub nom. Hunter v. Martin, 18 Va. 1 (1815)

Holding
- Article Three of the U.S. Constitution grants the U.S. Supreme Court jurisdiction and authority over state courts on matters involving federal law.

Court membership
- Chief Justice John Marshall Associate Justices Bushrod Washington · William Johnson; H. Brockholst Livingston · Thomas Todd; Gabriel Duvall · Joseph Story

Case opinions
- Majority: Story, joined by Washington, Livingston, Todd, Duvall
- Concurrence: Johnson
- Marshall took no part in the consideration or decision of the case.

Laws applied
- U.S. Const. art. III

Martin v. Hunter's Lessee, 14 U.S. (1 Wheat.) 304 (1816), is a landmark decision of the Supreme Court of the United States that asserted ultimate Supreme Court authority over state courts in civil matters of federal law.

Though Chief Justice John Marshall wrote most of the Supreme Court opinions during his tenure, he did not write this opinion. Marshall instead recused himself, citing a conflict of interest due to his relatives' interest in the property. Justice Joseph Story wrote the decision for a unanimous court.

== Facts ==
During the American Revolution, the Commonwealth of Virginia enacted legislation that allowed it to confiscate Loyalists' property. Land owned by a loyalist, Martin, part of the Northern Neck Property, was confiscated by the State and transferred to David Hunter. The Treaty of Paris (1783) between Great Britain and the United States nullified such confiscations, permitting Martin to sue for the return of the property. The trial court ruled in his favor, but the Virginia Supreme Court upheld the confiscation. The court did not rule that Virginia law was superior to U.S. treaties, but held that the treaty did not cover the dispute in question. On review in Fairfax's Devisee v. Hunter's Lessee, 11 U.S. 603 (1813), the U.S. Supreme Court disagreed with this conclusion, ruling that the treaty did in fact cover the dispute, and remanded the case back to the Virginia Supreme Court. The Virginia court in turn decided that the U.S. Supreme Court did not have authority over cases originating in state court:

The Court is unanimously of opinion, that the appellate power of the Supreme Court of the United States does not extend to this Court, under a sound construction of the Constitution of the United States; that so much of the 25th section of the act of Congress to establish the judicial courts of the United States, as extends the appellate jurisdiction of the Supreme Court to this Court, is not in pursuance of the Constitution of the United States; that the writ of error in this cause was improvidently allowed under the authority of that act; that the proceedings thereon in the Supreme Court were coram non judice in relation to this Court, and that obedience to its mandate be declined by the Court.

The U.S. Supreme Court reversed the state court's decision on appeal, ruling that questions of federal law were within its jurisdiction, and thereby establishing its own supremacy in matters of constitutional interpretation.

== Judgment ==
Story first confronted the argument that federal judicial power came from the states, and therefore that the Supreme Court had no right to overrule a state's interpretation of the treaty without its consent. Story found that it was clear from history and the preamble of the Constitution that the federal power was given directly by the people and not by the states.

Story then cited Article III, Section 2, Clause 2, showing a textual commitment to allow Supreme Court judicial review of state decisions:

In all Cases affecting Ambassadors, other public Ministers and Consuls, and those in which a State shall be Party, the supreme Court shall have original Jurisdiction. In all the other Cases before mentioned, the supreme Court shall have appellate Jurisdiction, both as to Law and Fact, with such Exceptions, and under such Regulations as the Congress shall make.

If the Supreme Court could not review the decisions of the highest state court, state courts would be excluded from ever hearing a case involving a federal question. Thus, because it was established that the states had the power to rule on federal issues it must be true that the Supreme Court can review the decision, or the Supreme Court would not have appellate jurisdiction in "all other cases" as stated by the Constitution.

Furthermore, the Supremacy Clause declares that federal interpretation trumps the state's interpretation. Story rejected concerns over State judicial sovereignty. Under Article I, Section 10 of the Constitution specific limits are placed upon the "sovereignty" of state governments. The Supreme Court could already review state executive and legislative decisions and this case was no different.

Story then confronted the argument that state judges were bound to uphold the Constitution just as federal judges were, and so denying state interpretations presumed that the state judges would less than faithfully interpret the Constitution. Story countered that even if state judges were not biased, the issue was not bias but uniformity in federal law. Furthermore, the legislative power to remove a case to federal court would be inadequate for maintaining this uniformity. Finally, Story applied these principles of judicial review to the decisions below and found that the state court's decision was in error.

Story said the following in his judgment:

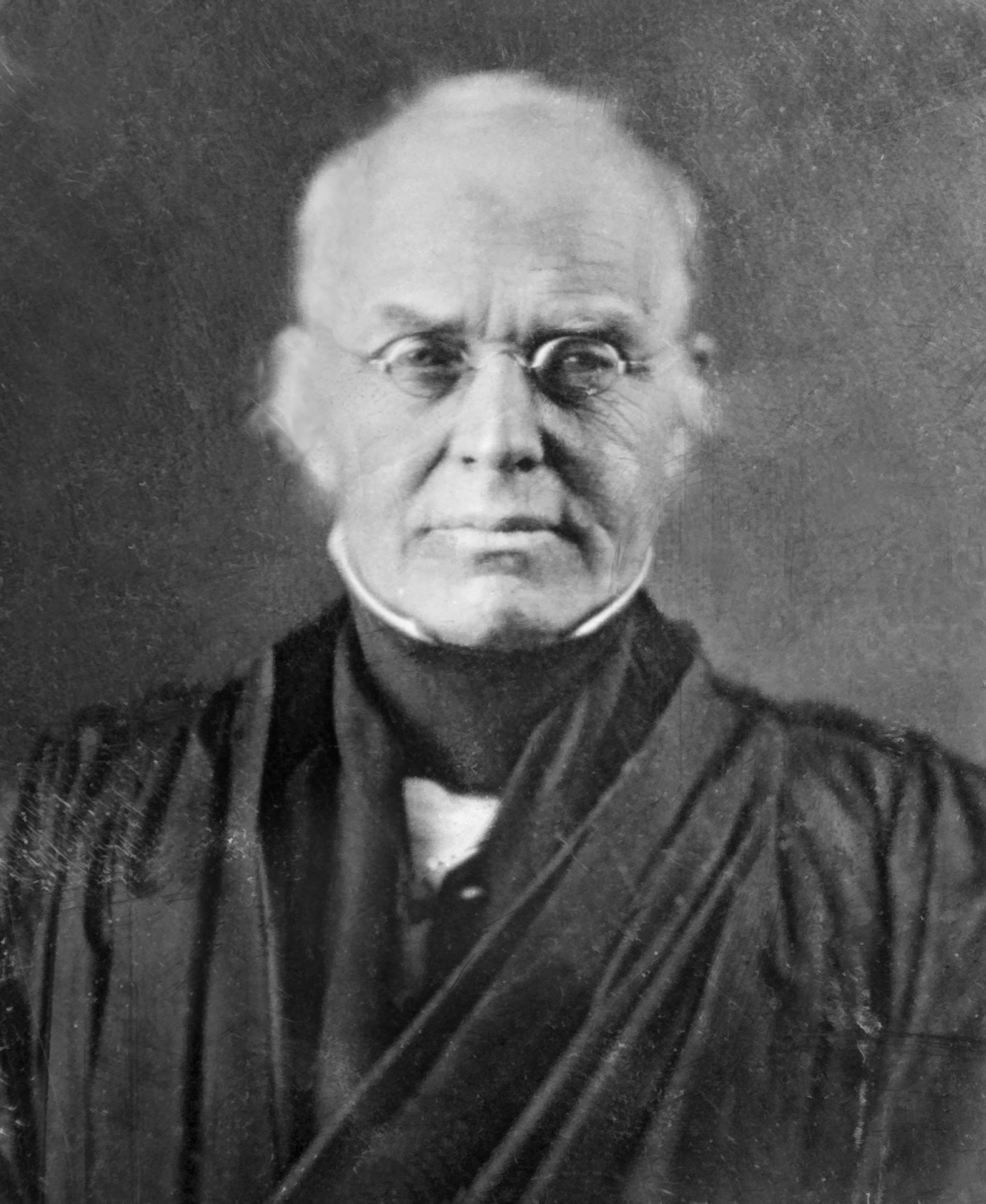
Joseph Story.

The constitution of the United States was ordained and established, not by the states in their sovereign capacities, but emphatically, as the preamble of the constitution declares, by 'the people of the United States.' There can be no doubt that it was competent to the people to invest the general government with all the powers which they might deem proper and necessary; to extend or restrain these powers according to their own good pleasure, and to give them a paramount and supreme authority. As little doubt can there be, that the people had a right to prohibit to the states the exercise of any powers which were, in their judgment, incompatible with the objects of the general compact; to make the powers of the state governments, in given cases, subordinate to those of the nation, or to reserve to themselves those sovereign authorities which they might not choose to delegate to either. The constitution was not, therefore, necessarily carved out of existing state sovereignties, nor a surrender of powers already existing in state institutions, for the powers of the states depend upon their own constitutions; and the people of every state had the right to modify and restrain them, according to their own views of the policy or principle. On the other hand, it is perfectly clear that the sovereign powers vested in the state governments, by their respective constitutions, remained unaltered and unimpaired, except so far as they were granted to the government of the United States.

These deductions do not rest upon general reasoning, plain and obvious as they seem to be. They have been positively recognised by one of the articles in amendment of the constitution, which declares, that 'the powers not delegated to the United States by the constitution, nor prohibited by it to the states, are reserved to the states respectively, or to the people.' The government, then, of the United States, can claim no powers which are not granted to it by the constitution, and the powers actually granted, must be such as are expressly given, or given by necessary implication. On the other hand, this instrument, like every other grant, is to have a reasonable construction, according to the import of its terms; and where a power is expressly given in general terms, it is not to be restrained to particular cases, unless that construction grow out of the context expressly, or by necessary implication. The words are to be taken in their natural and obvious sense, and not in a sense unreasonably restricted or enlarged.

The constitution unavoidably deals in general language. It did not suit the purposes of the people, in framing this great charter of our liberties, to provide for minute specifications of its powers, or to declare the means by which those powers should be carried into execution. It was foreseen that this would be a perilous and difficult, if not an impracticable, task. The instrument was not intended to provide merely for the exigencies of a few years, but was to endure through a long lapse of ages, the events of which were locked up in the inscrutable purposes of Providence. It could not be foreseen what new changes and modifications of power might be indispensable to effectuate the general objects of the charter; and restrictions and specifications, which, at the present, might seem salutary, might, in the end, prove the overthrow of the system itself. Hence its powers are expressed in general terms, leaving to the legislature, from time to time, to adopt its own means to effectuate legitimate objects, and to mould and model the exercise of its powers, as its own wisdom, and the public interests, should require.

The vote tally was 6 to 0, with Johnson giving a concurring opinion.

== See also ==
- Cohens v. Virginia, 19 U.S. 264 (1821) (a parallel case raising the issue of federal judicial review of state criminal, as opposed to civil, matters)
- Barron v. Baltimore (1833)
- List of United States Supreme Court cases, volume 14
- Jurisdiction stripping
- Treaty of Paris (1783)
- Jay Treaty
