= Gibbons v. Ogden =

1824 U.S. Supreme Court case on interstate market regulation

- Supreme Court of the United States

Argued February 5, 1824 Decided March 2, 1824
- Full case name: Thomas Gibbons, Appellant v. Aaron Ogden, Respondent
- Citations: 22 U.S. 1 (more) 9 Wheat. 1; 16 L. Ed. 23; 1824 U.S. LEXIS 370
- Decision: Opinion

Case history
- Prior: Appeal from the Court for the Trial of Impeachments and Correction of Errors of the State of New York

Holding
- The New York law is invalid because the Commerce Clause of the Constitution designates power to Congress to regulate interstate commerce, and the broad definition of commerce includes navigation.

Court membership
- Chief Justice John Marshall Associate Justices Bushrod Washington · William Johnson; Thomas Todd · Gabriel Duvall; Joseph Story · Smith Thompson

Case opinions
- Majority: Marshall, joined by Washington, Todd, Duvall, Story
- Concurrence: Johnson
- Thompson took no part in the consideration or decision of the case.

Laws applied
- U.S. Const. art. I sec. 8 clause 3

Gibbons v. Ogden, 22 U.S. (9 Wheat.) 1 (1824), is a landmark decision of the Supreme Court of the United States which held that the power to regulate interstate commerce, which is granted to the U.S. Congress by the Commerce Clause of the U.S. Constitution, encompasses the power to regulate navigation. The decision is credited with supporting the economic growth of the antebellum United States and the creation of national markets. Gibbons v. Ogden has since provided the basis for Congress' regulation of railroads, freeways and television and radio broadcasts.

The exiled Irish patriot Thomas Addis Emmet, as well as Thomas J. Oakley, argued for Ogden, and U.S. Attorney General William Wirt and Daniel Webster argued for Gibbons.

== Background ==
In 1798, the New York State Legislature granted to Robert R. Livingston and Robert Fulton exclusive navigation privileges of all the waters within the jurisdiction of that state with boats moved by fire or steam for a term of 20 years. Livingston and Fulton subsequently also petitioned other states and territorial legislatures for similar monopolies in the hope of developing a national network of steamboat lines, but only the Orleans Territory accepted their petition; it awarded them a monopoly on the lower Mississippi River.

Aware of the potential of the new steamboat navigation, competitors challenged Livingston and Fulton by arguing that the commerce power of the federal government was exclusive and superseded state laws. Legal challenges followed, and in response, the monopoly attempted to undercut its rivals by selling them franchises or buying their boats. Former New Jersey Governor Aaron Ogden had tried to defy the monopoly but ultimately purchased a license from a Livingston and Fulton assignee in 1815 and entered business with Thomas Gibbons from Georgia. The partnership collapsed three years later, however, when Gibbons operated another steamboat on Ogden's route between Elizabeth-town, New Jersey (now Elizabeth), and New York City, which had been licensed by the U.S. Congress under a 1793 law regulating the coasting trade. The partners ended up in the New York Court for the Trial of Impeachments, which granted a permanent injunction against Gibbons in 1820.

== Case ==
Ogden filed a complaint in the Court of Chancery of New York to ask the court to restrain Gibbons from operating on those waters. Ogden's lawyer contended that states often passed laws on issues regarding interstate matters and should have fully-concurrent power with Congress on matters concerning interstate commerce.

Gibbons's lawyer, Daniel Webster, however, argued that Congress had exclusive national power over interstate commerce according to Article I, Section 8, Clause 3, of the U.S. Constitution and that to argue otherwise would result in confusing and contradictory local regulatory policies. The Court of Chancery of New York and the Court of Errors of New York found in favor of Ogden and issued an injunction to restrict Gibbons from operating his boats.

Gibbons appealed to the Supreme Court and argued, as he had in New York, that the monopoly conflicted with federal law. After several delays, the court began discussing the meaning of the commerce clause in 1824, which had now become an issue of wider interest. Congress was debating a bill to provide a federal survey of roads and canals.

Southerners, in particular, were growing more sensitive to what result a holding for exclusive federal jurisdiction over commerce would mean to them as sectional disputes, especially over slavery, were increasing. Just 18 months prior to oral arguments in the Gibbons v. Ogden case, the people of Charleston, South Carolina, had been dismayed at the revelation of Denmark Vesey's plotted slave revolt. The statehouse quickly followed up the preemptive suppression of the rebellion with the Negro Seamen Act, which required free black sailors on ships coming into the state to be jailed for the duration of the ship's stay in port. The act was promptly struck down as unconstitutional by Associate Justice Johnson, who was riding federal circuit, on the ground that the act violated commercial treaty provisions with the United Kingdom. South Carolina emphatically rejected Johnson's holding, and talk quickly emerged of nullification and violent disunion. To thread the needle in the Gibbons case, the Court would need to deliver a holding that both defended national power over interstate commerce but did not eradicate state police powers, which Southern whites viewed as vital to their very survival.

== Ruling ==
The Supreme Court ruled in favor of Gibbons on the grounds that Congress has the right to regulate interstate commerce. The sole decided source of Congress's power to promulgate the law at issue was the Commerce Clause. Accordingly, the Court had to answer whether the law regulated "commerce" that was "among the several states." With respect to "commerce," the Court held that commerce is more than mere traffic and is the trade of commodities, a broader definition that includes navigation, inspection laws, quarantine laws, health laws, roads and ferries that exist within a single state. The Court interpreted "among" to mean "intermingled with:"

If, as has always been understood, the sovereignty of Congress, though limited to specified objects, is plenary as to those objects, the power over commerce with foreign nations and among the several States is vested in Congress as absolutely as it would be in a single government, having in its Constitution the same restrictions on the exercise of the power as are found in the Constitution of the United States.

The Court referenced the Federal Coasting Act of 1793, which was an act of Congress regulating maritime trade, and setting weight limits for license requirements. Using the 10th and 12th sections of the act, the Court states that the Act supports the "exclusive grants to Congress of power over commerce."

The Court did not discuss the argument pressed for Gibbons by U.S. Attorney General Wirt that the federal patent laws pre-empted New York's patent grant to Fulton and Livingston. That question remained undecided for the next 140 years until the Supreme Court held in Sears, Roebuck & Co. v. Stiffel Co. (1964) that federal patent law pre-empted similar state laws.

All told, it was one of the longest set of opinions in Supreme Court history up to that point.

== Excerpts ==
- The power to "regulate Commerce" is:

the power to regulate; that is, to prescribe the rule by which commerce is to be governed. This power, like all others vested in Congress, is complete in itself, may be exercised to its utmost extent, and acknowledges no limitations, other than are prescribed in the Constitution.

- In interpreting the power of Congress as to commerce "among the several states":

The word "among" means intermingled with. A thing which is among others, is intermingled with them. Commerce among the States, cannot stop at the external boundary line of each State, but may be introduced into the interior ... Comprehensive as the word "among" is, it may very properly be restricted to that commerce which concerns more States than one.

- Defining how far the power of Congress extends:

The power of Congress, then, comprehends navigation, within the limits of every State in the Union; so far as that navigation may be, in any manner, connected with "commerce with foreign nations, or among the several States."

- Powers that remain with the states:

State inspection laws, health laws, and laws for regulating the internal commerce of a State, and those which respect turnpike roads, ferries, &c. are not within the power granted to Congress.

== See also ==
- List of United States Supreme Court cases, volume 22
