= Comptroller of the Treasury =

Former position in U.S. Department of Treasury

The Comptroller of the Treasury was an official of the United States Department of the Treasury from 1781 to 1921. The Comptroller's office was established by resolution of the Continental Congress in 1778. According to section III of the Act of Congress establishing the Treasury Department, it is the comptroller's duty to

superintend the adjustment and preservation of the public accounts; to examine all accounts settled by the Auditor, and certify the balances arising thereon to the Register; to countersign all warrants drawn by the Secretary of the Treasury, which shall be warranted by law; to report to the Secretary the official forms of all papers to be issued in the different offices for collecting the public revenue, and the manner and form of keeping and stating the accounts of the several persons employed therein. He shall moreover provide for the regular and punctual payment of all monies which may be collected, and shall direct prosecutions for all delinquencies of officers of the revenue, and for debts that are, or shall be due to the United States.

The first person to hold this office was Nicholas Eveleigh. It was also held for a time by Gabriel Duvall, who would later serve on the Supreme Court of the United States. The office was originally known as the First Comptroller of the Treasury until it was abolished and replaced with the office of the Comptroller of the Treasury in 1894. The office of the Comptroller of the Treasury was abolished in 1921, with many of its duties transferring to the Comptroller General.

== List of officeholders ==
| No. | Portrait | Name (born–died) | Term of office | | | Appointing president | Ref. |
| No. | Portrait | Name (born–died) | Took office | Left office | Time in office | Appointing president | Ref. |
|---|---|---|---|---|---|---|---|
| 1 | | Nicholas Eveleigh (c. 1748–1791) | September 11, 1789 | April 16, 1791 | 1 year, 218 days | George Washington | |
| 2 | | Oliver Wolcott Jr. (1760–1833) | 1791 | 1795 | 4 years | George Washington | |
| 3 | | John Davis (1761–1847) | 1795 | 1796 | | George Washington | |
| 4 | | John Steele (1764–1815) | July 1, 1796 | December 15, 1802 | 6 years, 168 days | George Washington | |
| 5 | | Gabriel Duvall (1752–1844) | 1802 | 1811 | 9 years | Thomas Jefferson | |
| 6 | | Richard Rush (1780–1859) | November 1811 | 1812 | 1 year | James Madison | |
| | | Ezekiel Bacon (1776–1870) | February 11, 1814 | February 28, 1815 | 1 year, 17 days | James Madison | |
| | | Joseph Anderson (1757–1837) | 1815 | 1836 | 21 years | James Madison | |
| | | George Wolf (1777–1840) | 1836 | | | Andrew Jackson | |
| | | James Nelson Barker (1784–1858) | 1838 | ? | | Martin Van Buren | |
| | | Walter Forward (1786–1852) | March 6, 1841 | September 13, 1841 | 192 days | William Henry Harrison | |
| | | Elisha Whittlesey (1st appt) (1783–1863) | May 31, 1849 | March 26, 1857 | | Zachary Taylor | |
| | | William Medill (1802-1865) | 1857 | 1861 | | James Buchanan | |
| | | Elisha Whittlesey (2nd appt) (1783–1863) | April 10, 1861 | January 7, 1863 | | Abraham Lincoln | |
| | | Robert Walker Taylor Sr. (1812–1878) | January 14, 1863 | February 25, 1878 | 15 years, 47 days | Abraham Lincoln | |
| | | Albert G. Porter (1824–1897) | 1878 | 1880 | 2 years | Rutherford B. Hayes | |
| ? | | William Lawrence (1819–1899) | 1880 | March 24, 1885 | 5 years | Rutherford B. Hayes | |
| | | Milton J. Durham (1824–1911) | 1885 | 1889 | 4 years | Grover Cleveland | |
| | | Asa C. Matthews | 1889 | | | Benjamin Harrison | |
| ? | | Robert Tracewell (1852–1922) | March 4, 1897 | June 15, 1914 | 17 years, 107 days | William McKinley | |
| | | George Eddy Downey | 1913 | 1915 | | Woodrow Wilson | |
| | | Walter W. Warwick | 1915? | 1921 | | Woodrow Wilson | |
