= Marietta (Glenn Dale, Maryland) =

Historic house in Maryland, United States

- U.S. National Register of Historic Places
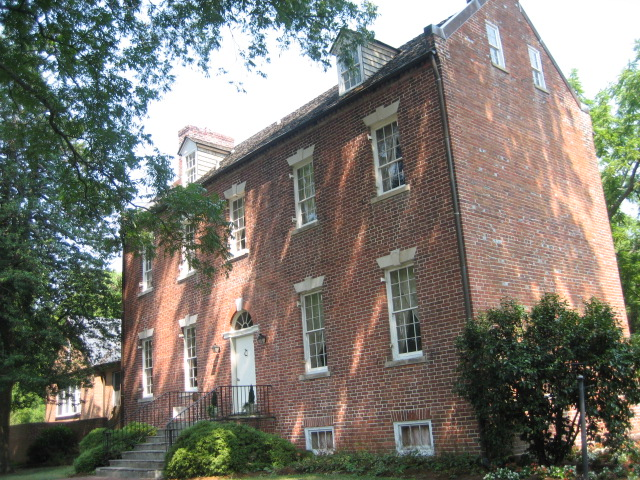

- Location within Maryland Location within the United States
- Nearest city: 5626 Bell Station Rd., Glenn Dale, Maryland
- Coordinates: 38°57′56″N 76°47′57″W
- Area: 24 acres (9.7 ha)
- Built: 1812
- Architectural style: Federal
- NRHP reference No.: 94000729
- Added to NRHP: July 25, 1994

Marietta is a historic house and former tobacco plantation located in Glenn Dale, Prince George's County, Maryland, United States. On the National Register of Historic Places and the National Underground Railroad Network to Freedom, Marietta House Museum includes a federal era house, a cemetery, the original root cellar, and harness room, as well as Gabriel Duvall's original law office building. The historic site sits on 25 acres of Marietta's original 690 acres. Today, visitors can walk the grounds and tour the plantation buildings and sites where free and enslaved people lived and labored.

== History ==
Marietta is a 2.5-story brick Federal house, built in 1812–13, in a traditional I-house plan. It is an important example of a late Federal style brick house. The main block is five bays by two, and the main entrance is through the central bay of the south facade. Attached perpendicular to the north side of the main block at right angles is a two-story rear wing, built c. 1832, and attached to the west gable end is an L-shaped wing added in 1968. Marietta stands on terraced, landscaped grounds with two contemporary outbuildings: a brick law office and a stone and brick root cellar/harness storage room.

Enslaved people built Marietta at the direction of Gabriel Duvall (1752-1844), who was a lawyer, Maryland legislator, U.S. Congressman, U.S. Comptroller, and U.S. Supreme Court Justice from 1811 to 1835.

The Duvall family enslaved many people at Marietta until the state ended slavery in Maryland in 1864. In any given year between 1812 and 1865, anywhere between nine and forty enslaved people lived and worked at Marietta. Among the enslaved at Marietta were multiple generations of the Duckett, Butler, Jackson, and Brown families. After Justice Duvall died in 1844, Marietta remained the residence of his heirs until 1902.

== Gallery ==
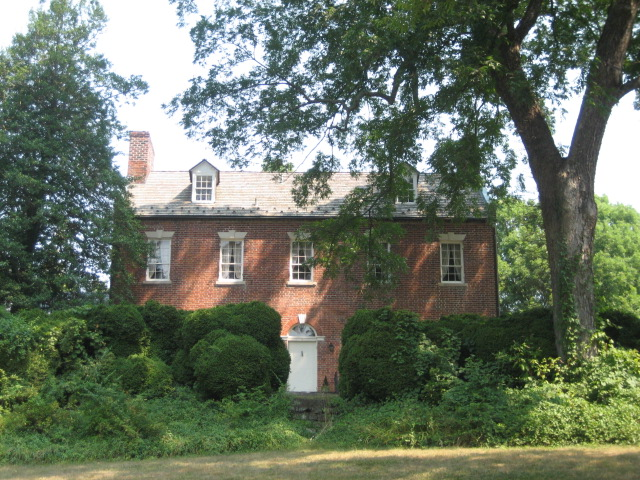
Marietta House Museum in August 2007

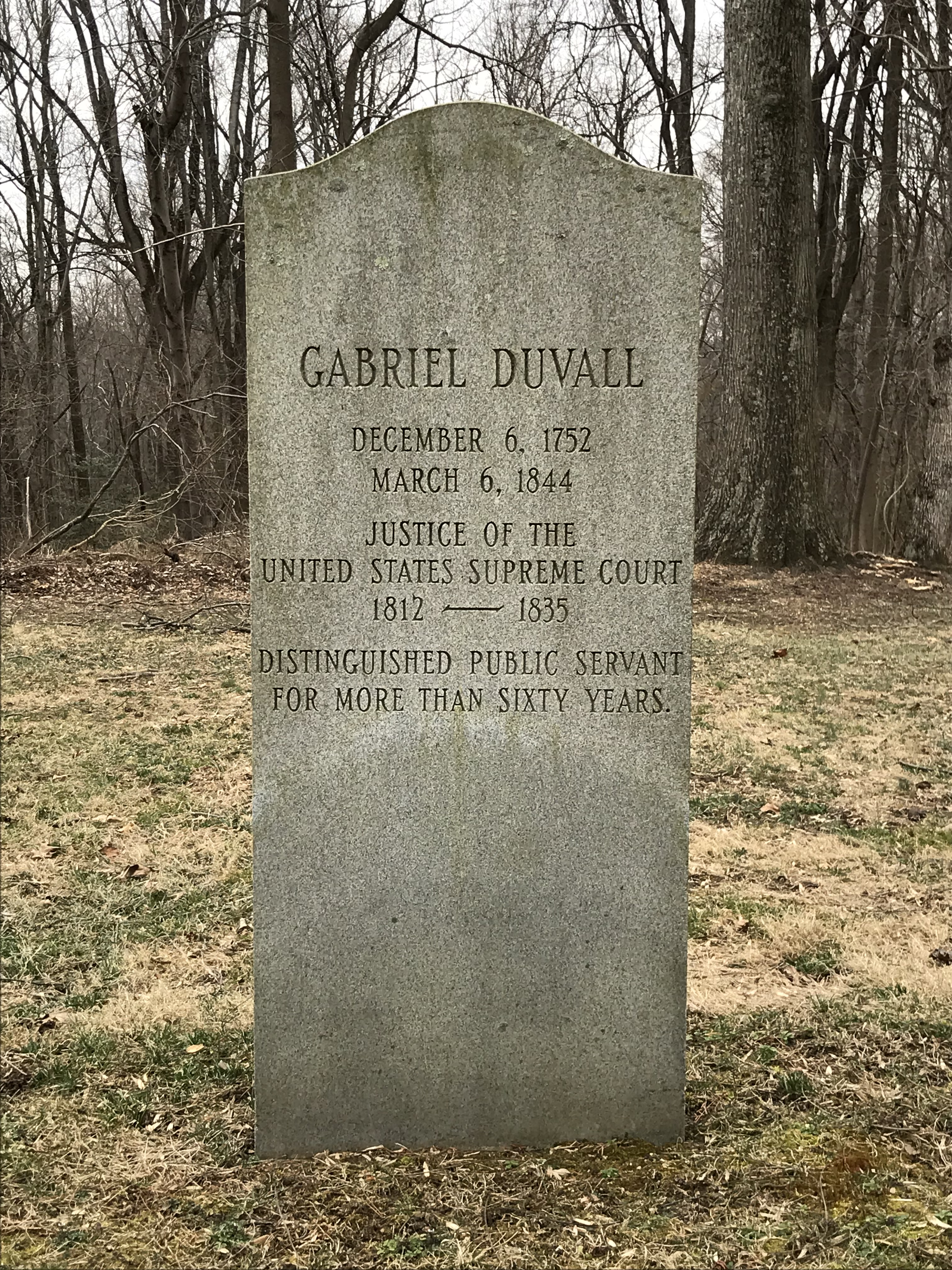
Gravesite of Justice Gabriel Duvall
