= Nicholas Eveleigh =

American politician

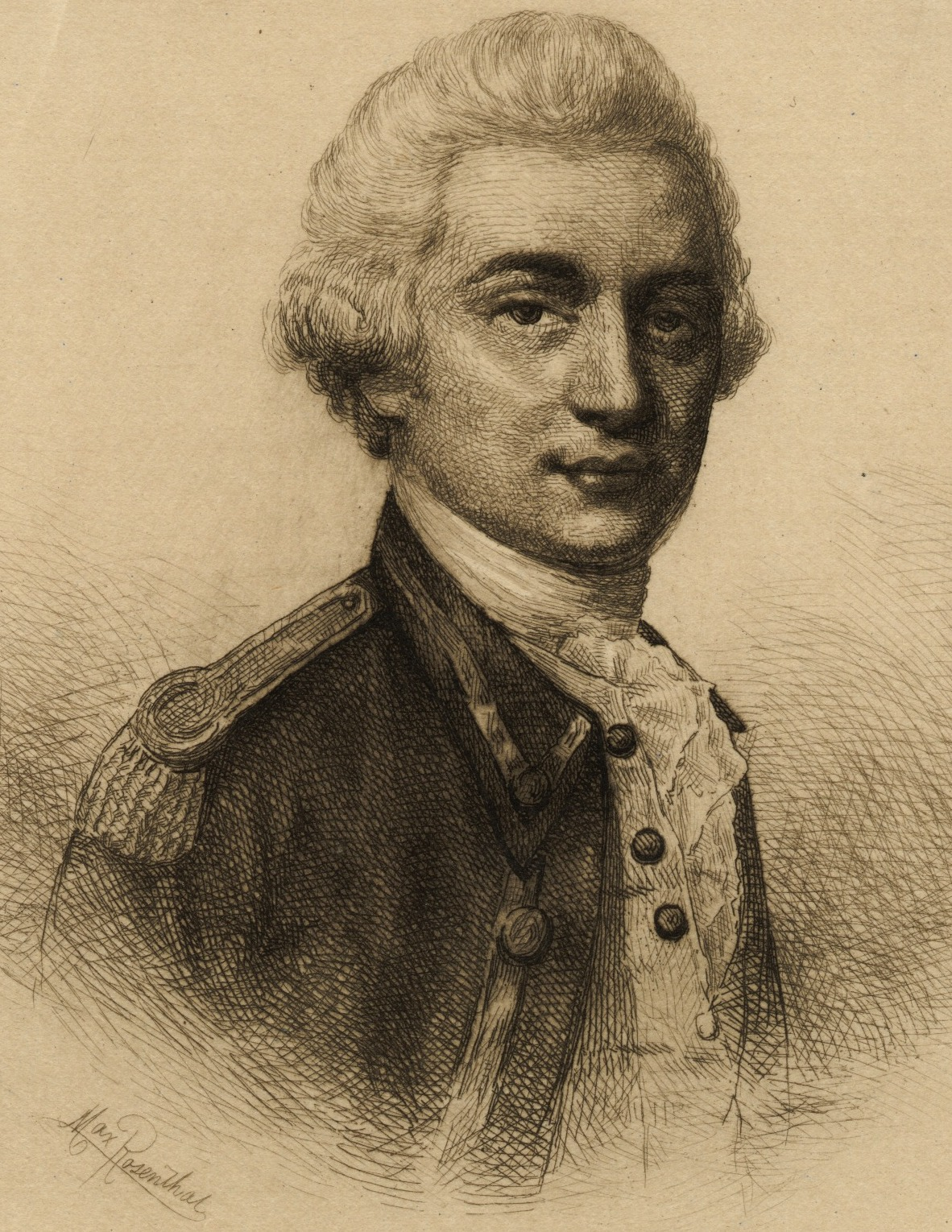
- Etching of Nicholas Eveleigh by Max Rosenthal

Member of the South Carolina State's Council
- In office 1783–1783

Member of the Congress of the Confederation
- In office 1781–1782

Member of the South Carolina House of Representatives
- In office 1781–1781

Personal details
- Born: c. 1748 Charleston, Province of South Carolina, British America
- Died: April 16, 1791 (aged 42–43) Philadelphia, Pennsylvania, U.S.
- Spouse: Mary
- Military career
- Branch: Continental Army
- Service years: 1775–1778
- Rank: Deputy Adjutant General
- Commands: 2nd South Carolina Regiment
- Conflicts: American Revolutionary War; Fort Moultrie

Nicholas Eveleigh (c. 1748 – April 16, 1791) was an American planter and political leader who was a delegate to the Continental Congress for South Carolina in 1781 and 1782.

== Early life ==
Eveleigh was born in Charleston, Province of South Carolina about 1748. He and his parents moved to Bristol, England around 1755. He remained there until 1774, although he conducted some business related to family property from London. Then he returned to South Carolina where he made his home for the rest of his life.

== Career ==
In the Revolutionary War, Eveleigh first joined the 2nd South Carolina Regiment as a captain on June 17, 1775. After he participated in the defense of Fort Moultrie on June 28, 1776, he was promoted to colonel. He later served as the deputy Adjutant General for the Continental Army for South Carolina and Georgia. He resigned on August 24, 1778.

Eveleigh was elected to the South Carolina House of Representatives in 1781. Later that year, they sent him as one of their delegates to the Continental Congress. In 1782, he returned home and served as a member of the State's Council (later called the state senate) in 1783. He left public service for a time, and worked to improve his plantation.

On September 11, 1789 Eveleigh became the first Comptroller of the Treasury, under President George Washington.

== Personal life ==
Eveleigh and his wife, Mary, had no children. She survived him and later remarried, to become the second wife of widower Edward Rutledge.

== Death ==
Eveleigh died in office in Philadelphia, Pennsylvania on April 16, 1791. Washington appointed Oliver Wolcott Jr. to replace him.
