= Hite v. Fairfax =

Court case over disputed land in 18th-century America

Hite v. Fairfax, (Original Case Citation: 4 Call 42) 8 Va. 42 (1786) was a case decided by the Supreme Court of Virginia that upheld the original title of land granted to Thomas Fairfax, 6th Lord Fairfax of Cameron, over what was known as the Northern Neck of Virginia, a large tract of land located between the headwaters of the Potomac and Rappahannock Rivers claimed by Jost Hite.

Future Chief Justice of the United States John Marshall successfully represented the successors of Fairfax to the title. The land currently makes up what is currently considered Northern Virginia and the Fairfax namesake county, Fairfax County, Virginia, comprises a small portion of this land.

Marshall represented the tenants of Lord Fairfax, and won his case. From this time, as an examination of Call's Virginia Reports, which cover the period, shows, he maintained the leadership of the bar of Virginia.

The case is available in Virginia Reports--Jefferson-33 Gratten--1730-1880--Call's Reports Volumes 1-6, page 646

Marshall's argument at the bar is available here beginning in the third paragraph with "Marshall, for such of the tenants...."
