= Coram non judice =

Legal term

Coram non judice, Latin for "not before a judge", is a legal term typically used to indicate a legal proceeding that is outside the presence of a judge (or in the presence of a person who is not a judge), with improper venue, or without jurisdiction. Any indictment or sentence passed by a court which has no authority to try an accused of that offence, is clearly in violation of the law and would be coram non judice and a nullity. The exception non sui juris, "not of one's own right", is available at any time, including after judgment (Bracton).

The "coram" part of the term means "in the presence of".

== See also ==
- Coram nobis
- Sub judice
- Martin v. Hunter's Lessee
