= William Johnson (judge) =

US Supreme Court justice from 1804 to 1834

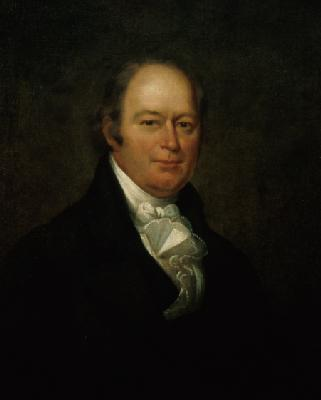

Associate Justice of the Supreme Court of the United States
- In office May 7, 1804 – August 4, 1834
- Nominated by: Thomas Jefferson
- Preceded by: Alfred Moore
- Succeeded by: James M. Wayne

11th Speaker of the South Carolina House of Representatives
- In office 1798–1800
- Preceded by: Robert Barnwell
- Succeeded by: Theodore Gaillard

Personal details
- Born: December 27, 1771 St. James Goose Creek Parish, South Carolina, British America
- Died: August 4, 1834 (aged 62) New York City, New York, U.S.
- Party: Democratic-Republican
- Spouse: Sarah Bennett (1794–1834)
- Education: Princeton University (BA)

William Johnson Jr. (December 27, 1771 – August 4, 1834) was an American attorney, state legislator, and jurist who served as an Associate Justice of the Supreme Court of the United States from 1804 until his death in 1834. When he was 32 years old, Johnson was appointed to the Supreme Court by President Thomas Jefferson. He was the first Jeffersonian Republican member of the Court as well as the second Justice from the state of South Carolina. During his tenure, Johnson restored the act of delivering seriatim opinions. He wrote about half of the dissents during the Marshall Court, leading historians to nickname him the "first dissenter".

Johnson wrote the majority opinion for two major cases (including United States v. Hudson) and hundreds of majority opinions in minor admiralty, land, and insurance cases. He supported a strong federal government in economic matters, leading him to join the majority in cases such as McCulloch v. Maryland, Gibbons v. Ogden, and Fletcher v. Peck, to the dismay of Jefferson and other Republicans.

Johnson's strong federalist opinions while sitting as a circuit justice for the District of South Carolina made him a social pariah in his home state. In 1834, he moved to Brooklyn, New York, where he died later that year from surgery complications. Like most justices on the Marshall Court, Johnson's contributions to the law were overshadowed by Chief Justice John Marshall. Beginning in the 1950s and 1960s, Johnson's jurisprudence became a topic of some scholarship.

== Early life ==
Johnson was born in St. James Goose Creek Parish (now part of Berkeley County, South Carolina) to William Johnson Sr., a blacksmith who had moved to South Carolina from New York, and Sarah Johnson (née Nightingale). Both of his parents were supporters of the American Revolution. During the Revolution, Johnson Sr. was considered by British authorities to be "one of the most dangerous and important of the rebels." He led Charleston revolutionaries alongside Christopher Gadsden and was the originator of Charleston's Liberty Tree. Following the siege of Charleston, both Johnson Sr. and Gadsden were imprisoned in St. Augustine, Florida by British commander Sir Henry Clinton. Johnson Jr., alongside his brother and mother (who was also a revolutionary), subsequently fled to New York City, where they lived for the remainder of the Revolution. Following the war, Johnson Sr. was a representative for Charleston in the South Carolina General Assembly.

Johnson was fourteen in the summer of 1787 when delegates met at the Constitutional Convention. According to one Supreme Court historian, "nothing shaped Johnson’s habits of mind more powerfully than the experience of revolution."

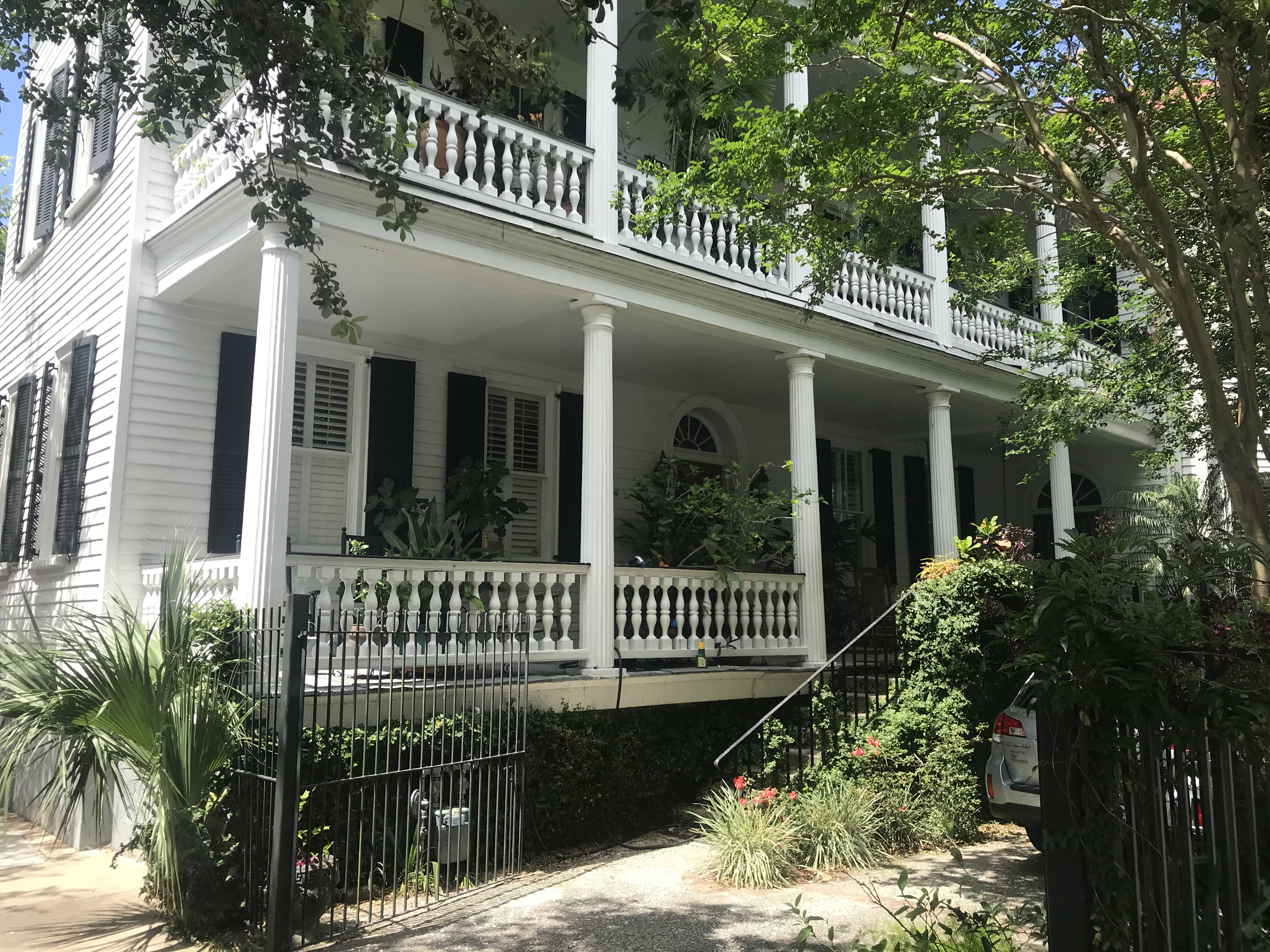
The William Johnson House on Rutledge Avenue in Charleston, South Carolina

In 1790, Johnson graduated from Princeton University first in his class. Three years later, he passed the bar after tutelage under Charles Cotesworth Pinckney. Johnson was a member of the Democratic-Republican Party and represented Charleston in the South Carolina House of Representatives from 1794 to 1800. In his last term, from 1798 to 1800, he served as Speaker of the House. In 1799, Johnson helped pass a bill to reorganize the state judiciary. Later that year, he was also appointed an associate justice of the state Court of General Sessions and Common Pleas, a position created by Johnson's reorganization. The service on that court also included a position on the state Constitutional Court, the highest court in the state at the time.

In 1794, Johnson married Sarah Bennett, the sister of Thomas Bennett Jr., who later served as Governor of South Carolina. Johnson and Thomas were close friends, and Johnson and his wife named their son Thomas Bennett in honor of him. The couple had eight children together, six of whom survived. They also adopted two refugees from Santo Domingo.

In 1808, Johnson constructed a 2½-story Charleston single house home on Rutledge Avenue. While on the Supreme Court, Johnson owned slaves.

== Supreme Court career ==
On March 22, 1804, President Thomas Jefferson nominated Johnson to be an associate justice of the United States Supreme Court, as the successor of Alfred Moore. He was confirmed by the United States Senate by voice vote on March 24, 1804, and was sworn into office on May 7, 1804. Jefferson nominated the 32-year-old Johnson because he was from a similar geographic region as Moore, because Johnson's health would allow him to travel regularly (a requirement of the position at the time), and because Johnson adhered to Jeffersonian Republican principles. He was the first member of the Court who was not a Federalist. He was also, and as of 2026 remains, the youngest justice at the start of their Supreme Court tenure at 32 years, 132 days—Joseph Story, who was younger at his time of nomination in 1811, was eight days older than Johnson was at the start of their respective tenures.

In his years on the Court, Johnson developed a reputation as a frequent and articulate dissenter from the Federalist majority. While Chief Justice John Marshall was frequently able to steer the opinions of most of the justices, Johnson demonstrated an independent streak. Johnson restored the practice of delivering seriatim opinions (a separate opinion from the opinion of the Court) and from 1805 through 1833, he wrote nearly half of the Supreme Court's dissenting opinions. For this reason, he has been nicknamed the "first dissenter."

During his tenure, Johnson wrote the majority opinion for only two major cases: United States v. Hudson and Goodwin in 1812, and Mechanics' Bank of Alexandria v. Bank of Columbia in 1820. In U.S. v. Hudson, the Court held that federal courts lacked the power to develop common law crimes, a decision which was celebrated by Jeffersonians. However, in Mechanics' Bank, the Court established federal common law precedent that a federal judge could hear parol evidence to explain a written contractual agreement if the agreement's meaning was ambiguous. Johnson also wrote over a hundred majority opinions for "arcane land, admiralty, and insurance cases" as well as numerous concurrences. Following 1820, Johnson wrote fewer majority opinions and more dissents. The increase in dissents from Johnson may have been due to influence from Jefferson, who praised the practice and urged Johnson to publish more. Ultimately, Johnson wrote about half of the dissents during the Marshall Court.

=== Gilchrist v. Collector of Charleston (1808) ===
Following the Chesapeake–Leopard affair in 1807, President Thomas Jefferson signed the Embargo Act, which "expressly granted discretion to the state port collectors to detain any ship that appeared to be violating, or attempting to violate, the embargo." In 1808, shipowner Adam Gilchrist filed a mandamus action with the circuit court after his ship was detained following the direction of Secretary of Treasury Albert Gallatin. In Gilchrist v. Collector of Charleston (1808), Johnson, presiding over the court, ruled that "the collector’s actions would not be justified by Gallatin’s letter because in the embargo act Congress did not sanction the President (or the Department of Treasury) with the discretion to detain ships."

The case resulted in immediate backlash. While the Federalist press celebrated the decision, it remained unpopular with the majority of citizens. Between July and October 1808, Johnson publicly debated the decision with Attorney General Caesar Augustus Rodney in a series of letters published in Charleston newspapers. Ultimately, the Jefferson administration believed that the circuit court did not have the right to enforce a writ of mandamus. However, the case remains an important yet often forgotten judicial landmark that helped establish judicial independence.

The decision, Johnson's first major act of independence, was not appreciated by Jefferson. The two men stopped corresponding for a number of years after Gilchrist, and their friendship did not rekindle until Johnson restored their correspondence by offering "rare botanical seeds" to Jefferson. Johnson was nominated for Collector of the Port of Charleston on January 23, 1819, but chose to remain on the Court.

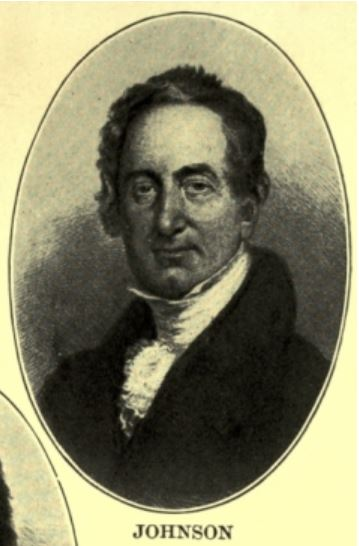
A depiction of Justice William Johnson in 1819

=== Contract Clause jurisprudence ===
In Fletcher v. Peck (1810), Johnson joined the majority of the Court to hold that a Georgia law voiding land grants given by the state the year prior was unconstitutional. It was the first time the Supreme Court ruled a state law as such. Johnson wrote a concurrence in Fletcher. He did not disagree with the Court's overall holding, but he feared the case may have been "feigned" due to possible collusion between the parties in order to establish precedent. He also disagreed with Marshall's reasoning that the Georgia law violated the Contract Clause. He believed that Marshall's interpretation of the Contract Clause, that impairments to contract obligations violated it, was overly broad and unnecessarily restrictive of state powers in favor of private rights. Instead, he believed the law violated the general principle of law that one could not revoke ownership in something one no longer owned.

In 1819, Johnson joined the majority in Dartmouth College v. Woodward. In Dartmouth, the Court held the Contract Clause applied to private corporations, that a private charter constituted a contract between parties, and that states could not interfere with that contract. Uncharacteristically, Johnson did not write a separate opinion in the case.

However, when the Supreme Court decided the 1823 case of Green v. Biddle, Johnson wrote a separate opinion. In Green, Johnson wrote an opinion that was part dissent, part concurrence. He concurred with the majority opinion that Kentucky's legislative act to restrict the rights of titleholders to their land was illegal but once again, as in Fletcher (1810), Johnson believed that the illegality of the act was due to its violation of general principles of law, and not due to it violating the Contract Clause. He forwent analyzing the Contract Clause as he felt it was unnecessary to the legal question in the case. Green v. Biddle was one of the Court's most important Contract Clause cases of the era, further expanding the clause to include public agreements such as the Virginia-Kentucky compact of 1792.

In 1827, Johnson joined Justice Bushrod Washington's majority opinion in Ogden v. Saunders (1827). The opinion held that the Contract Clause barred only retrospective laws affecting contracts, not prospective laws affecting contracts not yet signed. It was the only constitutional case in which Chief Justice Marshall ever dissented.

=== Federalism jurisprudence ===
In 1813, the Court of Appeals of Virginia, the state's highest court at the time, refused to follow the U.S. Supreme Court's decision in Fairfax v. Hunter's Lessee, a case in which Johnson had dissented, by arguing that the Supreme Court's appellate power did not extend to its court. In that case, the Supreme Court, using powers bestowed to it in the Judiciary Act of 1789, held that Virginia had improperly divested a family of title and reversed the state court. In 1816, the Supreme Court answered the defiance of the Court of Appeals of Virginia in Martin v. Hunter's Lessee. In Martin, Justice Joseph Story wrote for a unanimous court that "the appellate power of the United States does extend to cases pending in the State courts, and that the 25th section of the judiciary act, which authorizes the exercise of this jurisdiction in the specified cases by a writ of error, is supported by the letter and spirit of the Constitution."

The opinion written by Story frustrated Johnson's wish for a more "forceful assertion of Federal authority." In a concurring opinion, Johnson wrote that the Supreme Court was "constituted by the voice of the union, and when decisions take place which nothing but a spirit to give ground and harmonize can reconcile, [the Supreme Court's voice] is the superior claim upon the comity of the state tribunals." Johnson further expanded on federalism by stating that:

To me, the Constitution appears, in every line of it, to be a contract which, in legal language, may be denominated tripartite. The parties are the people, the States, and the United States. It is returning in a circle to contend that it professes to be the exclusive act of the people, for what have the people done but to form this compact? That the States are recognised as parties to it is evident from various passages, and particularly that in which the United States guaranty to each State a republican form of Government.

Johnson also joined two other landmark decisions on federalism. In 1819, he joined a unanimous Court in McCulloch v. Maryland, a case that struck down an attempt by the Maryland General Assembly to tax the Second Bank of the United States. McCulloch established that states could not interfere with the federal government's execution of constitutional powers and that the Necessary and Proper Clause gives Congress implied powers that are not enumerated in the U.S. Constitution. Two years later, in 1821, Johnson joined the unanimous opinion written by Chief Justice Marshall in Cohens v. Virginia, which held that the Supreme Court had the ability to review state criminal proceedings.

=== Denmark Vesey trial and Elkison v. Deliesseline (1822) ===
In 1822, Denmark Vesey, a free man of color, and several others were charged with allegedly planning a slave revolt in Charleston. City officials believed Vesey and his followers were planning on overrunning and killing the city's white slave owners and then fleeing to Haiti. The alleged Vesey conspiracy was a watershed moment in the lives of many white South Carolinians, but Johnson doubted the alleged threat and magnitude of the plot, which put him at odds with the beliefs of most white citizens, including his own daughter.

Johnson openly questioned the fairness of the resulting trial. He wrote a letter to the Charleston Courier in June 1822 and detailed an account of another previously-purported slave rebellion along the border of Georgia and South Carolina. The rebellion that Johnson cited had turned out to be only hearsay and resulted in the murder of an innocent man. Johnson claimed he believed the story "contained an useful moral, and might check the causes of agitation which were then operating upon the public mind" in Charleston.

Johnson was not alone in his criticism. Governor Thomas Bennett criticized the proceedings for being unfair since the trials were held privately, and the accused were not present when witnesses testified. The criticism from both Governor Bennett and Justice Johnson outraged members of the court trying the alleged plotters. In July 1822, the members published a rebuttal in the Charleston Courier, and the arrests and executions more than doubled.

After Denmark Vesey's arrest and trial, the South Carolina legislature amended the Negro Seaman's Act of 1820 to remove the exception for "free negro or mulatto seamen" from being temporarily arrested and imprisoned while their ship ported. Johnson feared that the case would lead to creditor-ship owners leaving free seamen in jail to avoid paying wages, as well as lead to other bans based on racial classification. In the case of Elkison v. Deliesseline (1822), Johnson, presiding over his duties on the Circuit Court for the District of South Carolina, found that "the transfer of commerce and treaty powers to the national government eliminated state authority to enact conflicting legislation" and therefore invalidated the statute. It was the first time since 1789 that a federal court invalidated state legislation because of its conflict with the Commerce Clause since it violated a treaty with the United Kingdom. The ruling enraged the white populations of the slave-holding states, and South Carolina nullified the ruling.

=== Gibbons v. Ogden (1824) ===
In 1824, the Marshall Court unanimously held in Gibbons v. Ogden that the Commerce Clause of the United States Constitution gave the federal government the right to regulate instrumentalities of commerce. In the majority opinion, Marshall held that a federal licensing law expressed Congress's intent to regulate steamboat commerce and that it invalidated a New York law creating a steamboat monopoly. In contrast, in Johnson's concurring opinion, he uncompromisingly argued that it was the federal government's exclusive power regardless of federal licensing laws. He further stated that because "[c]ommerce, in its simplest signification, means an exchange of goods", societal advances would lead to various mediums of exchange (such as labor and intelligence) entering into commerce, and therefore becoming "the objects of [federal] commercial regulation."

Johnson's concurrence was unexpectedly nationalist. He had been appointed to be a check on the nationalist Marshall, but instead he "outmarshalled Marshall." The opinion foreshadowed future constitutional debates regarding the Commerce Clause. In 2018, Justice Anthony Kennedy cited the concurrence in his majority opinion for South Dakota v. Wayfair Inc. and wrote that had Johnson's view "prevailed and States been denied the power of concurrent regulation, history might have seen sweeping federal regulations at an early date that foreclosed the States from experimentation with laws and policies of their own..."

=== Native American jurisprudence ===
The Georgia Gold Rush in the early 1830s led to two important cases regarding Native American sovereignty that Johnson heard on the bench. In Cherokee Nation v. Georgia (1831), the Cherokee Nation sought an injunction preventing Georgia from utilizing a series of laws to strip them of their rights and their land, asserting the laws violated treaties that the Nation had signed with the United States. The Court held that it did not have jurisdiction because "an Indian tribe or nation within the United States is not a foreign state in the sense of the constitution, and cannot maintain an action in the courts of the United States". In Johnson's concurrence, he stated that Indian tribes were "nothing more than wandering hordes, held together only by ties of blood and habit, and having neither rules nor government beyond what is required in a savage state."

The next year, Johnson again joined the majority in Worcester v. Georgia (1832), a landmark decision that held that the "Cherokee nation ... is a distinct community occupying its own territory in which the laws of Georgia can have no force."

=== Judicial philosophy ===
Johnson was a pioneer of judicial restraint and believed that the legislature and executive branch had a "superior competency and fitness" to deal with evolving problems. His jurisprudence relied on the idea of personal sovereignty enforced by legislation. While he believed an independent judiciary was important, he also believed that the legislature had the right to control the courts in order to protect its own sovereignty. His view of the judicial function differed significantly from the view of Chief Justice Marshall (as well as Justice Washington and Justice Story). Johnson's view on expanding federal jurisdiction, as seen in his lone dissent in Osborn v. Bank of the United States (1824), also differed from the Chief Justice's.

In 1807, Chief Justice Marshall, writing for the majority of the Court, granted two men who were implicated in the Burr conspiracy a writ of habeas corpus in Ex parte Bollman. Johnson dissented from the Marshall opinion, stating that the Supreme Court lacked both original and appellate jurisdiction and that the Judiciary Act did not give the Court the ability to issue the writ.

According to one historian, Johnson "valued commonsense argument, factual and doctrinal accuracy, solid annotation, and full disclosure of the circumstances of the case." Like Justice Oliver Wendell Holmes (who Johnson is theorized to have influenced), Johnson rarely cited cases.

== Career as author ==
In 1822, Johnson authored the two-volume Sketches of the Life and Correspondence of Nathanael Greene, a comprehensive work about Major General Nathanael Greene, who played a vital role in the defeat of the British during the American Revolution. The volume was ultimately a financial and critical failure at the time. One contemporary critic ridiculed it by stating that the book had a "poor developed arraignment of topics, an improper use of obscene sentences, and a dismal failure in its use of affected language." However, the historian Craig Newton in 1964 identified Johnson's volumes as a part of the historiography of South Carolina and stated that Johnson "spoke not only for the more competent biographers and historians but also for all others diligent in the preservation of the sources of the Revolution..." Several other historians have theorized that Johnson's political attachment to Jefferson was due in part to the power of Jefferson's recommendation and introduction to publishers. In the only surviving note in Andrew Jackson's correspondence which mentions Justice William Johnson, Jackson suggests Johnson was "interested mainly in literary fame and so could not be trusted to write a friend’s biography."

== Death and historic appraisal ==
=== Illness and death ===
Johnson became a social pariah in South Carolina following the nullification crisis in 1832 and 1833 because the state "was captured by a party with whose principles he unalterably opposed." In 1834, he became "fatally ill", and chose to move his residence to Brooklyn, New York. On August 4, 1834, following particularly painful surgery on his jaw to heal an infection, he died. Johnson had been told the surgery would likely kill him beforehand; however, he opted to proceed with the procedure, which may have been "botched". It has often been reported that he was buried in the churchyard of St. Philip's Episcopal Church in Charleston, South Carolina, where a large statue of him remains. However, the church does not have record of him ever being interred there.

=== Historic appraisal ===
Like most other Justices on the Marshall Court, Johnson's contributions to the Supreme Court were eclipsed by the chief justice. His views on the Constitution are considered "on the losing side" of historic constitutional debate. Historian Sandra Vanburkleo stated that Johnson fell "short of greatness" and that when "reputation depends on permanent contributions to doctrine, too much about Johnson was oppositionist or dyspeptic, and too little survived as precedent." Historian Fred Rodell, by contrast, named him as "the most underrated of all justices."

Until the 1950s and 1960s, scholarship on Justice Johnson was almost nonexistent. A biography on Johnson by Donald G. Morgan (the only book-length biography on Johnson thus far) published in 1954 spurred scholarship focusing on Johnson's dissents, republicanism, and independence. However, further research on Johnson has been inhibited by limited access to historical documents as families from South Carolina rarely preserved family papers.

== See also ==
- United States Supreme Court cases during the Marshall Court
- List of United States federal judges by longevity of service

Political offices
Preceded by Robert Barnwell	Speaker of the South Carolina House of Representatives; 1798–1800	Succeeded by Theodore Gaillard
Legal offices
Preceded by Alfred Moore	Associate Justice of the Supreme Court of the United States; 1804–1834	Succeeded by James Wayne
