= List of United States Supreme Court cases by the Marshall Court =

Supreme Court of the United States
Marshall Court
- Ellsworth Court ← → Taney Court
- Chief Justice John Marshall
- February 4, 1801 – July 6, 1835 (34 years, 152 days)
- Seat: Old Supreme Court Chamber; Washington, D.C.
- No. of positions: 6 (1801-1807); 7 (1807-1835)
- Marshall Court decisions

This is a partial chronological list of cases decided by the United States Supreme Court during the Marshall Court, the tenure of Chief Justice John Marshall from February 4, 1801 through July 6, 1835.

Case name	Citation	Summary
Talbot v. Seeman	5 U.S. 1 (1801)	Marine salvage rights in time of war
Marbury v. Madison	5 U.S. 137 (1803)	judicial review of laws enacted by the United States Congress
Stuart v. Laird	5 U.S. 299 (1803)	enforceability of rulings issued by judges who have since been removed from office
Murray v. The Charming Betsey	6 U.S. 64 (1804)	foreign relations and international sovereignty
Little v. Barreme	6 U.S. 170 (1804)	presidential and congressional power
Bailiff v. Tipping	6 U.S. 406 (1805)	a citation (a court order for a person to appear) must accompany a writ of error in order for the Supreme Court to hear the case
Strawbridge v. Curtiss	7 U.S. 267 (1806)	federal diversity jurisdiction
Ex parte Bollman	8 U.S. 75 (1807)	habeas corpus, definition of treason, Supreme Court's power to issue writs to circuit courts
Fletcher v. Peck	10 U.S. 87 (1810)	property rights
United States v. Hudson and Goodwin	11 U.S. 32 (1812)	Federal court jurisdiction over common law crimes
The Schooner Exchange v. M'Faddon	11 U.S. 116 (1812)	capture and possession of foreign ships
Fairfax's Devisee v. Hunter's Lessee	11 U.S. 603 (1813)	Loyalist property forfeiture
Martin v. Hunter's Lessee	14 U.S. 304 (1816)	Loyalist property forfeiture, Supreme Court review of state court judgments
Laidlaw v. Organ	15 U.S. 178 (1817)	the rule of caveat emptor in a commodity delivery contract
Craig v. Radford	16 U.S. 594 (1818)	Jay Treaty protection of alien enemy defeasible estate; surveying law
McCulloch v. Maryland	17 U.S. 316 (1819)	doctrine of implied powers
Sturges v. Crowninshield	17 U.S. 122 (1819)	constitutionality of state bankruptcy laws
Trustees of Dartmouth College v. Woodward	17 U.S. 518 (1819)	impairment of contracts
Cohens v. Virginia	19 U.S. 264 (1821)	judicial review of state supreme court decisions
Johnson v. McIntosh	21 U.S. 543 (1823)	inability of Native Americans to own land
Gibbons v. Ogden	22 U.S. 1 (1824)	Congressional power to regulate interstate commerce
Osborn v. Bank of the United States	22 U.S. 738 (1824)	scope of Article III jurisdiction; interpretation of the 11th Amendment
The Antelope	23 U.S. 66 (1825)	The Supreme Court's initial consideration of the legitimacy of the international slave trade.
Ogden v. Saunders	25 U.S. 213 (1827)	state bankruptcy law
American Ins. Co. v. 356 Bales of Cotton	26 U.S. 511 (1828)	The Territorial Clause and the ability of Congress to set up Article I tribunals
Willson v. Black-Bird Creek Marsh Co.	27 U.S. 245 (1829)	Dormant Commerce Clause
Cherokee Nation v. Georgia	30 U.S. 1 (1831)	Indian nations as foreign states
Worcester v. Georgia	31 U.S. 515 (1832)	Indian removal
Barron v. Baltimore	32 U.S. 243 (1833)	reach of the Bill of Rights
Ex Parte Madrazzo	32 U.S. 627 (1833)	standing in an admiralty case
Wheaton v. Peters	33 U.S. 591 (1834)	copyright perpetuity; common law copyright

== See also ==
- List of criminal cases in the Marshall Court
