= Amicus curiae =

Latin legal term meaning 'friend of the court'

An amicus curiae (lit. 'friend of the court'; pl. amici curiae) is an individual or organization that is not a party to a legal case, but that is permitted to assist a court by offering information, expertise, or insight that has a bearing on the issues in the case. Whether an amicus brief will be considered is typically under the court's discretion. The phrase is legal Latin and the origin of the term has been dated to 1605–1615. The scope of amici curiae is generally found in the cases where broad public interests are involved and concerns regarding civil rights are in question.

In American law, an amicus curiae typically refers to what in some other jurisdictions is known as an intervenor: a person or organization who requests to provide legal submissions so as to offer a relevant alternative or additional perspective regarding the matters in dispute. In the American courts, the amicus may be referred to as an amicus brief. In other jurisdictions, such as Canada, an amicus curiae is a lawyer who is asked by the court to provide legal submissions regarding issues that would otherwise not be aired properly, often because one or both of the parties is not represented by counsel.

In international courts, legal submissions by intervenors are called amicus curiae observations.

== History ==
Direct or indirect connections between the amicus curiae figure and the Roman juridical experience are still debated. Some scholars simply explain the Latin expression with the fact that the cultural elites' (including the jurists') language of the Anglo-Saxon world was Latin, so that many Latin legal terms first spread through English law, and then also in the Law of the United States. The Italian academic Giovanni Criscuoli, while admitting the theoretical possibility of eventually comparing it with the Roman figure of the "consiliarius", concludes that: "it is a figure of exclusive Anglo-Saxon blood".

Starting in the 9th century, it was incorporated into English law, and it was later extended to most common law systems. Later, it was introduced in international law, in particular concerning human rights. From there, it was integrated into some civil law systems (as of 2013, it has been integrated into Argentina's law system and Honduras's 2010 civil procedures code). Today, it is used by the European Court of Human Rights, the Inter-American Commission on Human Rights, the Inter-American Court of Human Rights, the Court of Justice of the European Union, and the Special Tribunal for Lebanon.

== Presentation ==
The role of an amicus was described by Lord Justice of Appeal Cyril Salmon in Allen v Sir Alfred McAlpine & Sons Ltd, as follows:

I had always understood that the role of an amicus curiae was to help the court by expounding the law impartially, or if one of the parties were unrepresented, by advancing the legal arguments on his behalf.

The situation most often noted in the press is when an advocacy group files a brief in a case before an appellate court in which it is not a litigant. Appellate cases are normally limited to the factual record and arguments coming from the lower court case under appeal; attorneys focus on the facts and arguments most favorable to their clients. Where a case may have broader implications, amicus curiae briefs are a way to articulate those concerns, so that the possibly broad legal or public policy implications of the court's anticipated decisions will not depend solely on the positions and arguments advanced by the parties directly involved in the case.

In prominent cases, amici curiae are generally organizations with sizable legal budgets. In the United States, for example, non-profit legal advocacy organizations, such as the American Civil Liberties Union, the Landmark Legal Foundation, the Pacific Legal Foundation, the Electronic Frontier Foundation, the American Center for Law and Justice, or the National Organization for the Reform of Marijuana Laws (NORML), frequently submit such briefs to advocate for or against a particular legal change or interpretation. If a decision could affect an entire industry, companies other than the litigants may wish to have their concerns heard. In the United States, federal courts often hear cases involving the constitutionality of state laws. Hence, states may file briefs as amici curiae when their laws or interests are likely to be affected, as in the Supreme Court case McDonald v. Chicago when thirty-two states under the aegis of Texas (and California independently) filed such briefs.

De facto amici curiae who do not file briefs may present in the print media and social media academic perspectives on the case. For example, if the law gives deference to a history of legislation of a certain topic, a historian may choose to evaluate the claim from their specialized expertise. Economists, statisticians, sociologists, etc., may choose to do the same. Newspaper editorials, blogs, and other opinion pieces arguably have the capability to influence Supreme Court decisions as de facto amici curiae. They are not, however, technically considered amici curiae, as they do not submit materials to the Court, do not need to ask for leave, and have no guarantee that they will be read.

== By country ==
=== Canada ===
In Canadian law, an amicus curiae is a lawyer, rather than an outside entity, who is asked by the Court to provide submissions in such a way as to make sure the legal issues affecting the interests of all parties are properly canvassed. For instance, the judge may appoint a lawyer as amicus curiae in cases where one of the parties (e.g. the accused in a criminal case) is unrepresented (and is ineligible for or refuses to apply for legal aid), and the judge is concerned that this will leave that party at a significant disadvantage and risk a miscarriage of justice. The lawyer is not retained by and does not represent the unrepresented party as such, but has a responsibility to ensure that points of law of importance to the party's case are brought to the attention of the court. For example, in the case of a criminal trial, the amicus will have the responsibility to ensure that the accused's right to make full answer and defence is upheld. Examples of situations that could call for the appointment of amicus could include a highly complex or technical trial, an unsophisticated accused or one with cognitive or psychiatric challenges, or an unruly and disruptive accused. In some cases, when an accused has retained counsel for part of the trial but then fires that counsel and if the judge finds that amicus is needed, the former counsel may be asked to remain as amicus, given their familiarity with the case.

One major case of an amicus brief in the Supreme Court was the Reference re Secession of Quebec. In that case, the federal government asked the Supreme Court to give an advisory opinion on several questions relating to the constitutional principles which might arise if the province of Quebec proposed to secede from Canada. The government of Quebec refused to participate in the reference. The Supreme Court appointed an amicus to make submissions commenting on the questions from the Quebec perspective.

Canadian courts may also appoint amici in situations where a party is represented by counsel, but issues emerge in a highly specialized or technical area of the law on which the judge wants submissions from a lawyer with special expertise in that area. For example, in R. v. Warren, 2022 ONSC 542, the judge appointed amicus to provide detailed submissions on the intersection between constitutional rights and prison law, explaining why this was normally outside the ken even of experienced criminal defence counsel.

Another situation in which amicus may be appointed is when an accused is self-represented in a trial for offences such as sexual assault or assault in a domestic violence context. An unrepresented accused has the right to cross-examine Crown witnesses, but it may be undesirable to permit them to personally cross-examine, for example, the complainant. As a result, the Criminal Code permits the judge to order that the accused will not personally cross-examine the witness and to name an uninvolved lawyer to conduct the cross-examination in place of the accused.

The role commonly described as amicus curiae in the United States is known as an "intervener" in Canada.

=== Italy ===
In Italian law, amici curiae are "nonprofit organizations and the institutional subjects, bearers of collective or diffuse interests related to the issue of constitutionality" who "may submit a written opinion to the constitutional Court".

=== Philippines ===
In the Philippines, amicus curae is understood as a person not party of a case but summoned to provide legal opinions or expertise to help resolve a question. In section 10 of the Internal Rules of the Supreme Court while does not define what a amici curiae is allows the high court to invite amicus curiae as necessary.

Separately, section 23, Canon III of the Code of Professional Responsibility and Accountability (CPRA) obliges lawyers to act as amicus curiae any proceeding relating to the lawyer's expertise or field of specialization if compelled by any court, tribunal, or other government agency if they do not have just cause to refuse.

=== United States ===
The Supreme Court of the United States has special rules for amicus curiae briefs sought to be filed in cases pending before it. Supreme Court Rule 37 states, in part, such a brief should cover "relevant matter" not dealt with by the parties which "may be of considerable help". The cover of an amicus brief must identify which party the brief is supporting, or if the brief supports only affirmance or reversal. The Court also requires that all non-governmental amici identify those providing a monetary contribution to the preparation or submission of the brief. Briefs must be prepared in booklet format, and 40 copies must be served with the Court.

The Supreme Court has seen a steady increase of amicus in its proceedings. In 2019-2020, 97% of proceedings included these filings, with only a few interventions in the earlier decades and the sharpest increase coming after 1966.

In the United States Supreme Court, unless the amicus brief is being filed by the federal government (or one of its officers or agents) or a U.S. state, permission of the court (by means of motion for leave) or mutual consent of the parties is generally required. Allowing an amicus curiae to present oral argument is considered "extraordinary". The court can also appoint its own amicus curiae if neither party supports the decision of the lower court, which it has done at least 44 times.

Religious groups regularly file amicus briefs at the U.S. Supreme Court. Muslim organizations and individuals, for example, have filed amicus briefs on both sides of recent cases dealing with divisive cultural issues, such as same-sex marriage and expansive conceptions of gender identity.

The first amicus curiae to appear before the Supreme Court was Henry Clay, in Green v. Biddle, 21 U.S. (8 Wheat.) 1 (1823), although he “did not prevail.”

== World Trade Organization (WTO) ==
The role of amicus curiae briefs in the World Trade Organization (WTO) dispute settlement system is controversial. The controversy arises due to the governmental nature of WTO disputes. As only WTO members have access to the system, any non-members such as non-governmental organizations (NGOs) are excluded and have no right to be heard. Thus, the only way for them to contribute to a WTO decision is through amicus curiae briefs. There remains a divergence in approaches in the WTO as to the admissibility of such briefs.

The first WTO case to comprehensively examine the admissibility of amicus curiae briefs was US – Shrimp. The case concerned a ban by the US on imports of all shrimp and shrimp products not caught with turtle excluder devices. The panel at first instance rejected the two amicus curiae briefs that were submitted by environmental groups, on the basis that they were not expressly solicited by the panel under Article 13 of the Dispute Settlement Understanding of the WTO. This was overturned by the Appellate Body who held a panel had authority to accept, consider, or reject briefs under Articles 12 and 13 of the Dispute Settlement Understanding regardless of whether they were expressly solicited.

The issue was re-examined in US – Lead and Bismuth II which concerned the imposition of duties by the US on certain imported hot rolled lead and bismuth carbon steel from the UK. The Panel at first instance affirmed the position in the US – Shrimp case and accepted two amicus curiae briefs that were submitted. On appeal, the Appellate Body relied on Article 17.9 of the Dispute Settlement Understanding and Rule 16(1) of the Working Procedures for Appellate Review to create rules to accept amicus curiae briefs. This was deemed as the source of legal authority to accept such briefs by an Appellate Body.

The next significant case to deal with amicus curiae briefs was EC – Asbestos, where the French government banned domestically produced and imported asbestos products. Of the five amicus curiae briefs received by the Panel, only two that were submitted by the European Community, were accepted. The panel did not provide any explanation as to why they were accepted or rejected. On appeal, the Appellate Body relied on Rule 16(1) of the Working Procedures for Appellate Review to create additional procedures to deal with the amicus curiae briefs. Of the 11 briefs submitted, the Appellate Body accepted none on the basis they failed to comply with these additional procedures.

== See also ==
- Intervention (law)
