= 1821 Georgia gubernatorial election =

- November 10, 1821
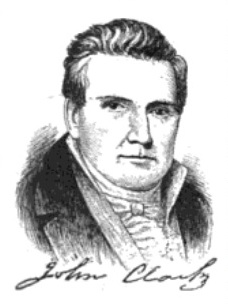

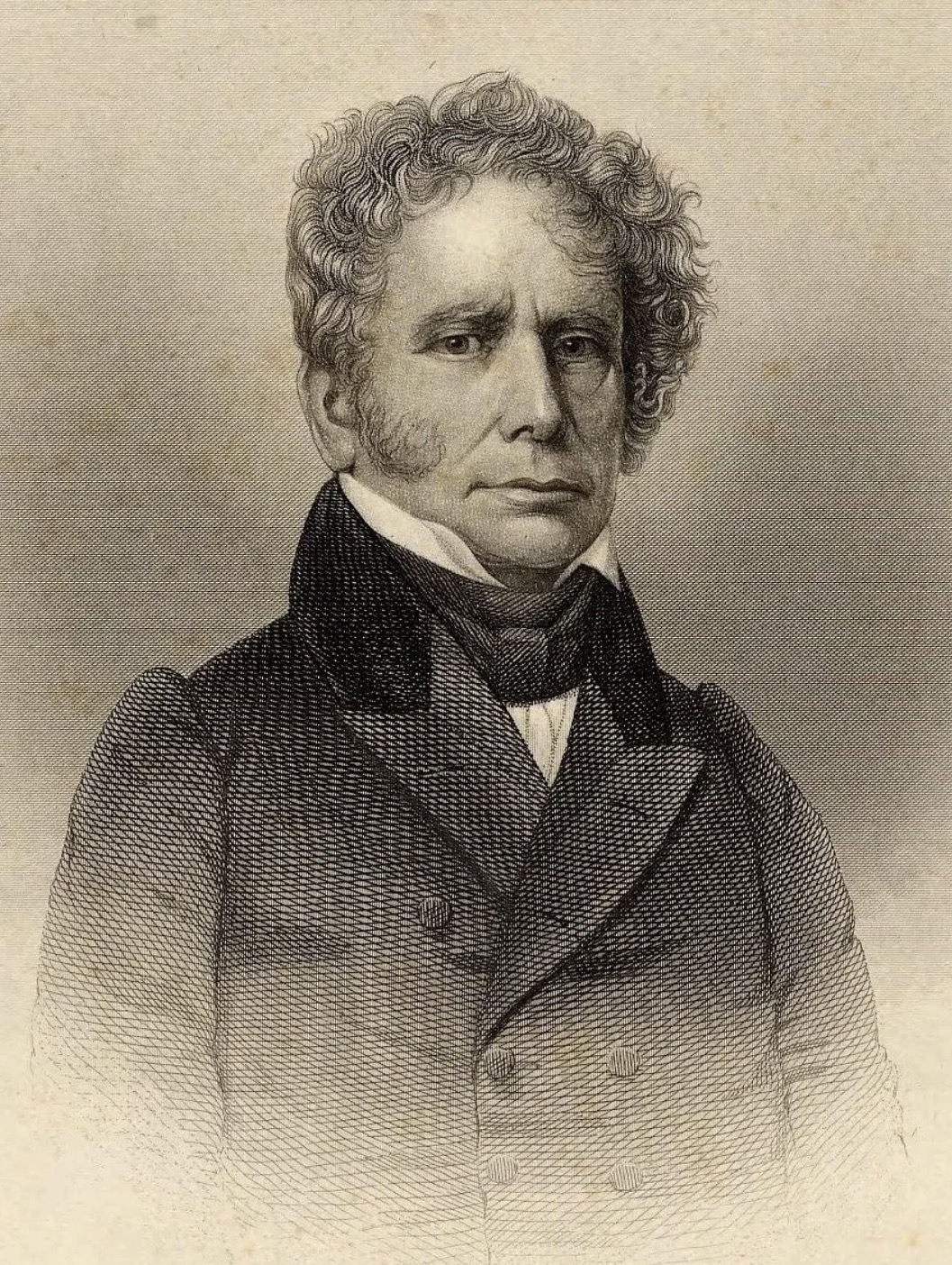
Nominee	John Clark	George Troup
Party	Democratic-Republican	Democratic-Republican
Popular vote	74	72
Percentage	50.69%	49.31%
Governor before election
John Clark
Democratic-Republican
Elected Governor
John Clark
Democratic-Republican

The 1821 Georgia gubernatorial election was held on November 10, 1821, in order to elect the Governor of Georgia. Democratic-Republican candidate and incumbent Governor John Clark narrowly defeated fellow Democratic-Republican candidate and former United States Senator for Georgia George Troup in a Georgia General Assembly vote, in a re-match of the previous election.

== General election ==
On election day, November 10, 1821, Democratic-Republican candidate John Clark won re-election against his opponent fellow Democratic-Republican candidate George Troup by a small margin. Clark was sworn in for his second term on November 10, 1821.

=== Results ===
Georgia gubernatorial election, 1821
Party	Candidate	Votes	%
Democratic-Republican	John Clark (incumbent)	74	50.69
Democratic-Republican	George Troup	72	49.31
Total votes		146	100.00
Democratic-Republican hold			
