= Gridiron (secret society) =

Secret society at University of Georgia, US

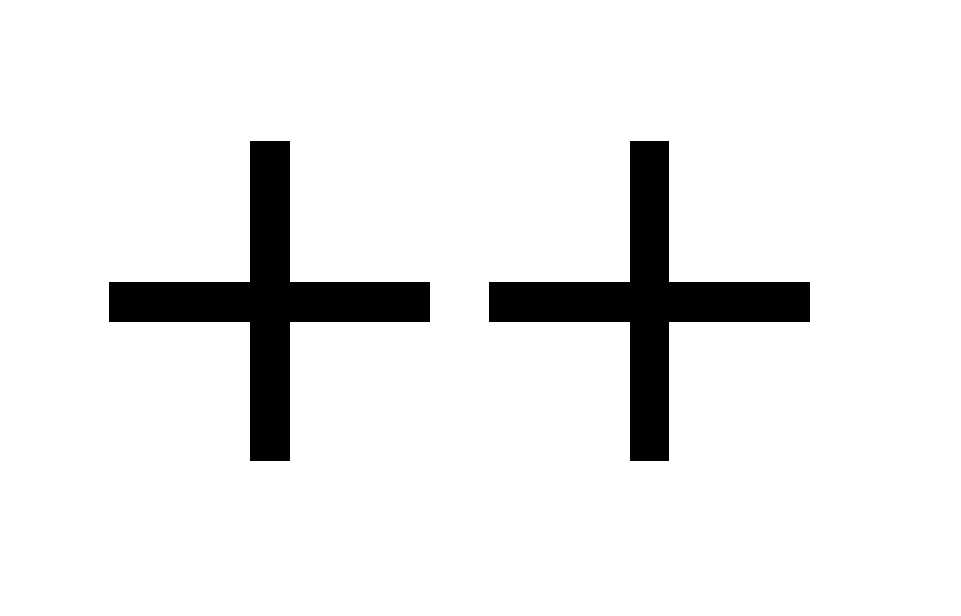
- Founded: 1908; 118 years ago University of Georgia
- Type: Secret
- Affiliation: Independent
- Status: Active
- Scope: Local
- Chapters: 1
- Headquarters: Athens, Georgia; United States

Gridiron is an American collegiate secret society at the University of Georgia in Athens, Georgia. It was established in 1908.

== History ==
Gridiron was founded in 1908 at the University of Georgia in Athens, Georgia. It is considered "the oldest and most prestigious organization on campus". Its members include most Governors of Georgia in the 20th century.

In 2025, David Ballard published The Order of Virtue, a historical thriller about the Gridiron.

== Symbols and traditions ==
Prospective members are called neophytes. Neophytes are required to master Sartor Resartus: The Life and Opinions of Herr Teufelsdröckh in Three Books by Thomas Carlyle.

== Membership ==
The society inducts outstanding student leaders biannually in the fall and spring. Gridiron also inducts notable Georgians as honorary members. Its membership is all male.

== Notable members ==
- Ellis Arnall, Governor of Georgia
- Chris Clark, former lead news anchor at WTVF in Nashville, Tennessee
- Jimmy Carter, president of the United States
- Sam Nunn, United States Senate
- Richard Russell Jr., Governor of Georgia, United States Senate
- Sonny Seiler, owner of the line of English bulldogs, successively named Uga I-XI, that serve as the live mascots for the University of Georgia
