= United States v. 422 Casks of Wine =

- Supreme Court of the United States

Decided February 15, 1828
- Full case name: United States v. 422 Casks of Wine, Hazard & Williams Claimants
- Docket no.: 26-547
- Citations: 26 U.S. 547 (more) 1 Pet. 547; 7 L. Ed. 257)

Case history
- Prior: The Sarah, 21 U.S. (8 Wheat.) 391 (1823)

Holding
- Claimants in in rem cases must put claims under oath.

Court membership
- Chief Justice John Marshall Associate Justices Bushrod Washington · William Johnson; Gabriel Duvall · Joseph Story; Smith Thompson · Robert Trimble

Case opinion
- Majority: Story

Laws applied
- Judiciary Act of 1789

United States v. 422 Casks of Wine, 26 U.S. (1 Pet.) 547 (1828), is an 1828 United States Supreme Court civil forfeiture case between the United States and 422 casks of Malaga wine. The case was brought after the United States moved to seize the wine on the grounds that it had been deliberately mislabeled as sherry to get a tax drawback, and the buyers objected. The original trial was ruled in favor of the United States but was ordered to be retried after errors were discovered concerning jurisdiction. In the subsequent retrial, the Supreme Court ruled against the United States; however, it did grant a certificate of seizure on probable cause.

The defendant in this case was an object rather than a person, making this a jurisdiction in rem case, power over objects, rather than the more familiar in personam case over persons.

== Background ==
The 422 casks of Malaga wine were imported into the United States via New York State as a false entry before being moved to New Orleans. The wine was seized, as it had been mislabeled as sherry and was being used to falsely claim a tax drawback in 1819. The seizure was challenged by Hazard and Williams, who were to purchase the wines from Charles Hall.

The case was first heard as "The Sarah", named after the ship on which the wine was seized. During the proceedings at the District Court of Louisiana, it was revealed that the wine was seized on land rather than on the sea, so the United States moved for a jury trial. The jury found for the United States, with the judge issuing a sentence of condemnation against the wine. The appellants for the wine appealed to the Supreme Court, arguing that there had been irregularities in the proceedings, as it had started as an Admiralty court case but then was treated as an Exchequer court case under the Judiciary Act of 1789 and should not have been a jury trial. The District Attorney argued that there was nothing stopping an Admiralty court from calling for a jury trial, citing the judices selecti of the Roman Empire. In 1823, the Supreme Court found that there were irregularities; when the court found that the wine was seized on land, the judge should have stopped the trial, as he had no jurisdiction. As such, the Supreme Court annulled the seizure order and remitted the case back to the District Court for retrial.

== Case ==
Upon the District Attorney amending the complaint to an Exchequer case, the jury in this case found in favor of the wines. The Attorney-General of the United States appealed the decision to the Supreme Court on the grounds of asking for a Writ of Error in that Hall, the real owner, had not expressed opposition to the seizure. Hazard and Williams argued that, as the buyers, they had legal title to the wine. Justice Story delivered the verdict. He stated that because Hazard and Williams had proved they had a proprietary interest in the wine, they were legally entitled to challenge the seizure even if they were not the real owners. The court also held that while the mislabeling may have been fraudulent, it did not mean that the transfer of ownership was automatically void unless the claimants stated so. The court found there had been no error and affirmed the jury's decision in favor of the wine; however, it did grant the United States a certificate of probable cause of seizure as the cause for seizure affirmed in the original jury verdict had not been denied. The case was returned to the District Court to either return the wine to the claimants or proceed with the seizure under the certificate. The case is cited as legal precedent for in rem cases where the claimant must put its claims on oath or the other party can insist on dismissal.
