= 1819 Georgia gubernatorial election =

- November 5, 1819
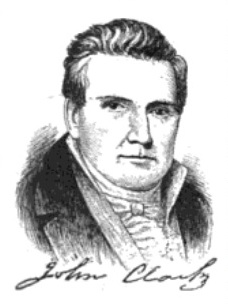

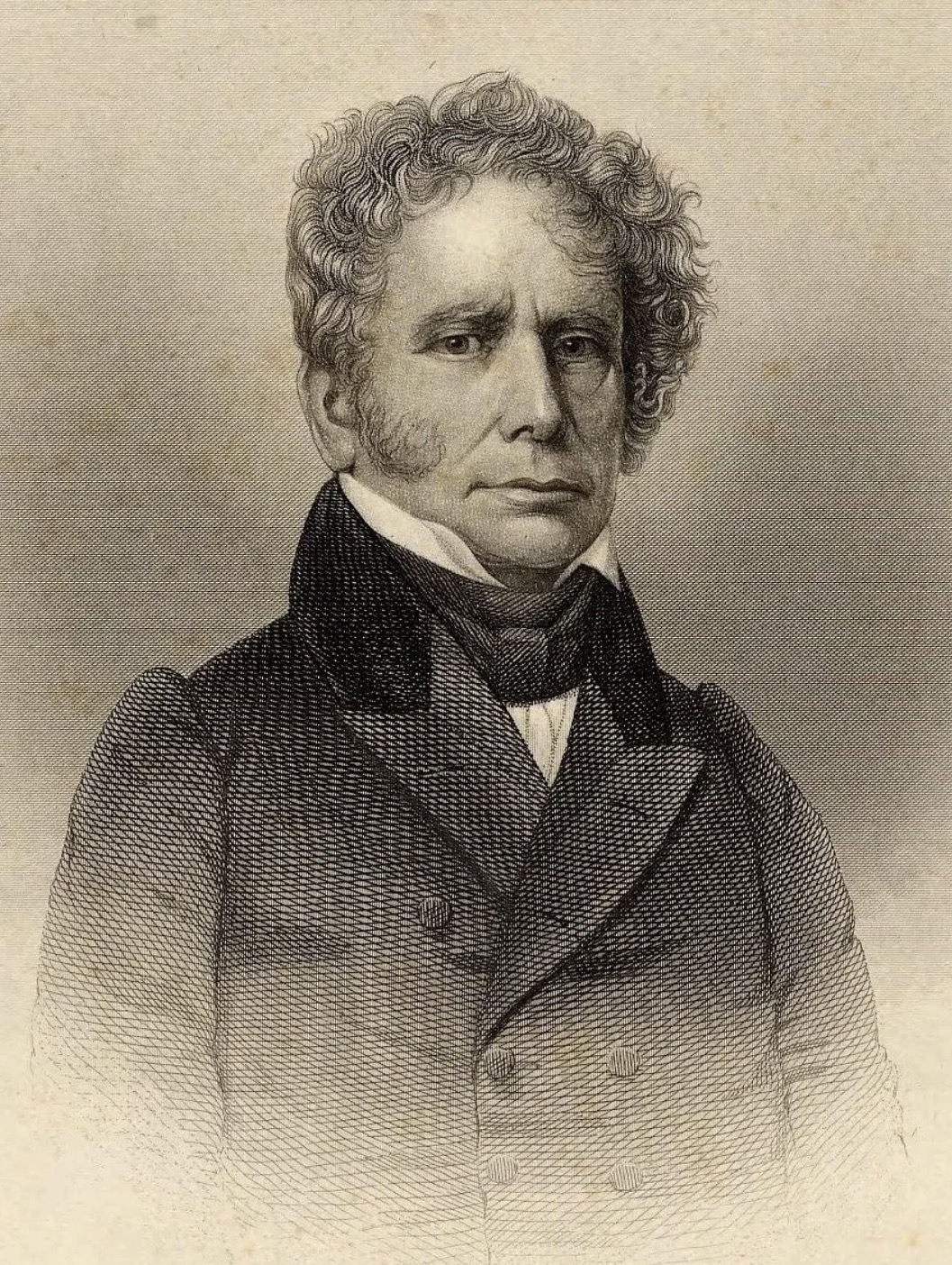
Nominee	John Clark	George Troup
Party	Democratic-Republican	Democratic-Republican
Popular vote	73	60
Percentage	54.89%	45.11%
Governor before election
Matthew Talbot
Democratic-Republican
Elected Governor
John Clark
Democratic-Republican

The 1819 Georgia gubernatorial election was held on November 5, 1819, in order to elect the Governor of Georgia. Democratic-Republican candidate John Clark defeated fellow Democratic-Republican candidate and former United States Senator for Georgia George Troup in a Georgia General Assembly vote.

== General election ==
On election day, November 5, 1819, Democratic-Republican candidate John Clark won the election against his opponent fellow Democratic-Republican candidate George Troup. Clark was sworn in as the 31st Governor of Georgia on November 5, 1819.

=== Results ===
Georgia gubernatorial election, 1819
Party	Candidate	Votes	%
Democratic-Republican	John Clark	73	54.89
Democratic-Republican	George Troup	60	45.11
Total votes		133	100.00
Democratic-Republican hold			
