= Mesne profits =

Money paid for right of immediate occupation of land

Mesne profits (/miːn/ MEEN) are sums of money paid for the occupation of land to a person with right of immediate occupation, where no permission has been given for that occupation. The concept is feudal in origin, and common in countries which rely on the English legal system (including many former British colonies). The word is derived from the root word demesne.

Mesne profits commonly occur where a landlord has obtained an order from a court to evict a tenant, or where an individual sues to eject a bona fide landowner to whom title to land was improperly conveyed. The mesne profit represents the value (living rent-free, profits earned from the land, etc.) the ejected tenant received from the property between the time the court ordered the eviction and the time when the tenant actually left the property. Mesne profits must be drawn from the land itself, rather than improvements on it. For example, mesne profits may accrue from growing crops on land but would not generally accrue from a factory built on the land (unless there were damage to the land or improvements to the land itself such as the removal of stone from a field).

A statute of limitations (usually six years) often limits the tenant-in-error's liability.

Calculating mesne profits is often regulated by statute, but may be litigated in a court of equity. Mesne profits may be calculated, even though there may be no point in doing so (as in the case where land was flooded by a dam, and the dam is not going to be removed). In the United States, laws regulating mesne profits have been the subject of Supreme Court decisions, such as Green v. Biddle, 21 U.S. 1 (1823).

== See also ==
- Housing tenure
