= Capron v. Van Noorden =

- Supreme Court of the United States

Decided March 5, 1804
- Full case name: Capron v. Van Noorden
- Citations: 6 U.S. 126 (more) 2 Cranch 126; 2 L. Ed. 229; 1804 U.S. LEXIS 253

Case history
- Prior: Error to the Circuit Court of North Carolina

Holding
- A plaintiff is allowed to dismiss a case that he had lost at trial because of a lack of diversity jurisdiction, leaving the plaintiff free to bring the case again.

Court membership
- Chief Justice John Marshall Associate Justices William Cushing · William Paterson; Samuel Chase · Bushrod Washington

Capron v. Van Noorden, 6 U.S. (2 Cranch) 126 (1804), was a United States Supreme Court case in which the Court allowed a plaintiff to dismiss a case that he had lost at trial because of a lack of diversity jurisdiction, leaving the plaintiff free to bring the case again in North Carolina.

Capron sued Van Noorden for negligently injuring him.

The plaintiff Capron argued that the federal court wasn't the proper court to hear the case. This argument ensued the decision of the federal court in favor of the defendant Van Noorden.
