= United States v. Fisher =

1905 US Supreme Court decision

- Supreme Court of the United States

Argued February 7-9 and 11-12, 1805 Decided February 21, 1805
- Full case name: United States v. Fisher
- Citations: 6 U.S. 358 (more)

Court membership
- Chief Justice John Marshall Associate Justices William Cushing · William Paterson; Samuel Chase · Bushrod Washington; William Johnson

Case opinion
- Majority: Marshall, joined by unanimous
- Washington took no part in the consideration or decision of the case.

United States v. Fisher, 6 U.S. 358 (1805), is a United States Supreme Court case about whether debts to the government are preferred for settlement in bankruptcy proceedings.

== Background ==
In April 1800, Congress passed a bankruptcy law stating that "nothing contained in this law, shall in any manner affect the right of preference to prior satisfaction of debts due to the United States." A March 1797 law previously stated "that where any revenue officer or other person hereafter becoming indebted to the United States by bond or otherwise, shall become insolvent, the debt due to the United States shall be first satisfied."

Upon insolvency, Peter Blight claimed that the 1797 law's title discouraged viewing it as a preference for settling government debts across all debtors, instead only applicable to those accountable for public funds.

== Supreme Court ==
Chief Justice John Marshall wrote for a unanimous court. Marshall contrasted the challenged clause's use of "or other person" with the preceding clauses' use of "or other person accountable for public money" to argue that Congress intended to prioritize settling debts to the government across all debtors.

In determining Congress' legislative intent in the challenged clause using the act's title, Marshall wrote that "where the mind labours to discover the design of the legislature, it seizes every thing from which aid can be derived; and in such case the title claims a degree of notice, and will have its due share of consideration." In 2024, retired Supreme Court Justice Stephen Breyer cited this quote as proof that the Marshall Court believed that statutory interpretation should go beyond textualism.

=== Addendum ===
Despite not participating in the case's oral arguments or decision, Associate Justice Bushrod Washington wrote an addendum explaining the Pennsylvania circuit court's contrary decision. Washington noted that besides the 1797 act's title referring to "receivers of public money," its other sections solely applied to such officials. Furthermore, Washington argued the 1800 law's phrasing suggested maintenance of specific preferences in debt collection, rather than a uniform preference for settling debts to the government.
