= List of United States Supreme Court cases, volume 299 =

Supreme Court of the United States
- Interactive map of Supreme Court of the United States
- 38°53′26″N 77°00′16″W
- Established: March 4, 1789; 236 years ago
- Location: Washington, D.C.
- Coordinates: 38°53′26″N 77°00′16″W
- Composition method: Presidential nomination with Senate confirmation
- Authorised by: Constitution of the United States, Art. III, § 1
- Judge term length: life tenure, subject to impeachment and removal
- Number of positions: 9 (by statute)
- Website: supremecourt.gov

This is a list of cases reported in volume 299 of United States Reports, decided by the Supreme Court of the United States in 1936 and 1937.

== Justices of the Supreme Court at the time of volume 299 U.S. ==
The Supreme Court is established by Article III, Section 1 of the Constitution of the United States, which says: "The judicial Power of the United States, shall be vested in one supreme Court . . .". The size of the Court is not specified; the Constitution leaves it to Congress to set the number of justices. Under the Judiciary Act of 1789 Congress originally fixed the number of justices at six (one chief justice and five associate justices). Since 1789 Congress has varied the size of the Court from six to seven, nine, ten, and back to nine justices (always including one chief justice).

When the cases in volume 299 were decided the Court comprised the following nine members:

Portrait	Justice	Office	Home State	Succeeded	Date confirmed by the Senate (Vote)	Tenure on Supreme Court
	Charles Evans Hughes	Chief Justice	New York	William Howard Taft	February 13, 1930 (52–26)	February 24, 1930 – June 30, 1941 (Retired)
	Willis Van Devanter	Associate Justice	Wyoming	Edward Douglass White (as Associate Justice)	December 15, 1910 (Acclamation)	January 3, 1911 – June 2, 1937 (Retired)
	James Clark McReynolds	Associate Justice	Tennessee	Horace Harmon Lurton	August 29, 1914 (44–6)	October 12, 1914 – January 31, 1941 (Retired)
	Louis Brandeis	Associate Justice	Massachusetts	Joseph Rucker Lamar	June 1, 1916 (47–22)	June 5, 1916 – February 13, 1939 (Retired)
	George Sutherland	Associate Justice	Utah	John Hessin Clarke	September 5, 1922 (Acclamation)	October 2, 1922 – January 17, 1938 (Retired)
	Pierce Butler	Associate Justice	Minnesota	William R. Day	December 21, 1922 (61–8)	January 2, 1923 – November 16, 1939 (Died)
	Harlan F. Stone	Associate Justice	New York	Joseph McKenna	February 5, 1925 (71–6)	March 2, 1925 – July 2, 1941 (Continued as chief justice)
	Owen Roberts	Associate Justice	Pennsylvania	Edward Terry Sanford	May 20, 1930 (Acclamation)	June 2, 1930 – July 31, 1945 (Resigned)
	Benjamin N. Cardozo	Associate Justice	New York	Oliver Wendell Holmes Jr.	February 24, 1932 (Acclamation)	March 14, 1932 – July 9, 1938 (Died)

== Notable Case in 299 U.S. ==
=== De Jonge v. Oregon ===
In De Jonge v. Oregon, 299 U.S. 353 (1937), the Supreme Court held that the Fourteenth Amendment's due process clause applies freedom of assembly against the states. The Court found that De Jonge had the right to speak at a peaceful public meeting held by the Communist Party, even though the party generally advocated an industrial or political change in revolution. However, in the 1950s with the fear of communism on the rise, the Court ruled in Dennis v. United States (1951) that Eugene Dennis, who was the leader of the Communist Party, violated the Smith Act by advocating the forcible overthrow of the United States government.

== Federal court system ==
Under the Judiciary Act of 1789 the federal court structure at the time comprised District Courts, which had general trial jurisdiction; Circuit Courts, which had mixed trial and appellate (from the US District Courts) jurisdiction; and the United States Supreme Court, which had appellate jurisdiction over the federal District and Circuit courts—and for certain issues over state courts. The Supreme Court also had limited original jurisdiction (i.e., in which cases could be filed directly with the Supreme Court without first having been heard by a lower federal or state court). There were one or more federal District Courts and/or Circuit Courts in each state, territory, or other geographical region.

The Judiciary Act of 1891 created the United States Courts of Appeals and reassigned the jurisdiction of most routine appeals from the district and circuit courts to these appellate courts. The Act created nine new courts that were originally known as the "United States Circuit Courts of Appeals." The new courts had jurisdiction over most appeals of lower court decisions. The Supreme Court could review either legal issues that a court of appeals certified or decisions of court of appeals by writ of certiorari. On January 1, 1912, the effective date of the Judicial Code of 1911, the old Circuit Courts were abolished, with their remaining trial court jurisdiction transferred to the U.S. District Courts.

== List of cases in volume 299 U.S. ==
Case name	Citation	Opinion of the Court	Vote	Concurring opinion or statement	Dissenting opinion or statement	Procedural jurisdiction	Result
Woolsey v. Best, Warden	299 U.S. 1 (1936)	per curiam	9-0	none	none	appeal from the Colorado Supreme Court (Colo.)	appeal dismissed
Pick Manufacturing Company v. General Motors Corporation	299 U.S. 3 (1936)	per curiam	6-0[a][b][c]	none	none	certiorari to the United States Court of Appeals for the Seventh Circuit (7th Cir.)	decree affirmed
Valentine, New York City Police Commissioner v. United States ex rel. Neidecker	299 U.S. 5 (1936)	Hughes	8-0[b]	none	none	certiorari to the United States Court of Appeals for the Second Circuit (2d Cir.)	decree affirmed
Tennessee Publishing Company v. American National Bank	299 U.S. 18 (1936)	Hughes	8-0[b]	none	none	certiorari to the United States Court of Appeals for the Sixth Circuit (6th Cir.)	decree affirmed
In re 620 Church Street Building Corporation	299 U.S. 24 (1936)	Hughes	8-0[b]	none	none	certiorari to the United States Court of Appeals for the Seventh Circuit (7th Cir.)	decree affirmed
Southeastern Express Company v. Pastime Amusement Company	299 U.S. 28 (1936)	per curiam	8-0[b]	none	none	certiorari to the South Carolina Supreme Court (S.C.)	judgment reversed, and cause remanded
Cate v. Beasley	299 U.S. 30 (1936)	per curiam	7-1[b]	none	McReynolds (without opinion)	certiorari to the Oklahoma Supreme Court (Okla.)	judgment affirmed
Valentine, Chairman of the Iowa State Board of Assessment and Review v. Great Atlantic and Pacific Tea Company	299 U.S. 32 (1936)	per curiam	6-2[b]	none	Brandeis and Cardozo (without opinions)	appeal from the United States District Court for the Southern District of Iowa (S.D. Iowa)	decree affirmed
Barwise v. Sheppard, Comptroller of Texas	299 U.S. 33 (1936)	VanDevanter	8-0[b]	none	none	appeal from the Texas Court of Civil Appeals (Tex. Ct. Civ. App.)	decree affirmed
P.J. Carlin Construction Company v. Heaney	299 U.S. 41 (1936)	McReynolds	8-0[b]	none	none	certiorari to the New York Supreme Court (N.Y. Sup. Ct.)	judgment affirmed
Jose Rivera Soler and Company v. United Firemen's Insurance Company of Philadelphia	299 U.S. 45 (1936)	McReynolds	8-0[b]	none	none	certiorari to the United States Court of Appeals for the First Circuit (1st Cir.)	judgment reversed
Mechanical Universal Joint Company v. Culhane	299 U.S. 51 (1936)	Brandeis	8-0[b]	none	none	certiorari to the United States Court of Appeals for the Seventh Circuit (7th Cir.)	judgment affirmed
State Board of Equalization of California v. Young's Market Company	299 U.S. 59 (1936)	Brandeis	8-0[b]	Butler (without opinion)	none	appeal from the United States District Court for the Southern District of California (S.D. Cal.)	judgment reversed
Bourdieu v. Pacific Western Oil Company	299 U.S. 65 (1936)	Sutherland	8-0[b]	none	none	certiorari to the United States Court of Appeals for the Ninth Circuit (9th Cir.)	decree reversed, and cause remanded
Missouri v. Ross	299 U.S. 72 (1936)	Sutherland	8-0[b]	none	none	certiorari to the United States Court of Appeals for the Eighth Circuit (8th Cir.)	decree affirmed
Foust v. Munson Steamship Lines	299 U.S. 77 (1936)	Butler	8-0[b]	none	none	certiorari to the United States Court of Appeals for the Second Circuit (2d Cir.)	decree reversed
Helvering, Commissioner of Internal Revenue v. Illinois Life Insurance Company	299 U.S. 88 (1936)	Butler	8-0[b]	none	none	certiorari to the United States Court of Appeals for the Seventh Circuit (7th Cir.)	decree reversed
Wainer v. United States	299 U.S. 92 (1936)	Roberts	8-0[b]	none	none	certiorari to the United States Court of Appeals for the Seventh Circuit (7th Cir.)	judgment affirmed
Essex Razor Blade Corporation v. Gillette Safety Razor Company	299 U.S. 94 (1936)	Roberts	8-0[b]	none	none	certiorari to the United States Court of Appeals for the Third Circuit (3d Cir.)	judgment reversed
Chisholm v. Gilmer	299 U.S. 99 (1936)	Cardozo	8-0[b]	none	none	certiorari to the United States Court of Appeals for the Fourth Circuit (4th Cir.)	judgment affirmed
Fox v. Capital Company	299 U.S. 105 (1936)	Cardozo	8-0[b]	none	none	certiorari to the United States Court of Appeals for the Second Circuit (2d Cir.)	decree affirmed
Gully, State Tax Collector for Mississippi v. First National Bank in Meridian	299 U.S. 109 (1936)	Cardozo	8-0[b]	none	none	certiorari to the United States Court of Appeals for the Fifth Circuit (5th Cir.)	judgment reversed, and cause remanded
McKee v. Paradise	299 U.S. 119 (1936)	Hughes	8-0[b]	none	none	certiorari to the United States Court of Appeals for the Seventh Circuit (7th Cir.)	decree reversed
United States v. Wood	299 U.S. 123 (1936)	Hughes	5-3[b]	none	McReynolds, Sutherland, and Butler (joint short statement)	certiorari to the United States Court of Appeals for the District of Columbia (D.C. Cir.)	judgment reversed
Villa v. Van Schaick, Superintendent of Insurance of New York	299 U.S. 152 (1936)	per curiam	8-0[b]	none	none	appeal from the New York Supreme Court (N.Y. Sup. Ct.)	judgment vacated, and cause remanded
Prairie Farmer Publishing Company v. Indiana Farmer's Guide Publishing Company	299 U.S. 156 (1936)	per curiam	8-0[b]	none	none	certiorari to the United States Court of Appeals for the Seventh Circuit (7th Cir.)	judgment reversed, and cause remanded
British-American Oil Production Company v. Board of Equalization of Montana	299 U.S. 159 (1936)	VanDevanter	8-0[b]	none	none	certiorari to the Montana Supreme Court (Mont.)	judgment affirmed
Mountain States Power Company v. Public Service Commission of Montana	299 U.S. 167 (1936)	McReynolds	8-0[b]	none	none	appeals from the United States District Court for the District of Montana (D. Mont.)	judgment reversed
Schafer v. Helvering, Commissioner of Internal Revenue	299 U.S. 171 (1936)	McReynolds	8-0[b]	none	none	certiorari to the United States Court of Appeals for the District of Columbia (D.C. Cir.)	judgment affirmed
Helvering, Commissioner of Internal Revenue v. Fried	299 U.S. 175 (1936)	McReynolds	8-0[b]	none	none	certiorari to the United States Court of Appeals for the Second Circuit (2d Cir.)	decree affirmed
John Hancock Mutual Life Insurance Company v. Yates	299 U.S. 178 (1936)	Brandeis	8-0[b]	none	none	certiorari to the Georgia Supreme Court (Ga.)	judgment reversed
Old Dearborn Distributing Company v. Seagram-Distillers Corporation	299 U.S. 183 (1936)	Sutherland	8-0[b]	none	none	appeal from the Illinois Supreme Court (Ill.)	decrees affirmed
Pep Boys, Manny, Moe and Jack of California, Inc. v. Pyroil Sales Company, Inc.	299 U.S. 198 (1936)	Sutherland	8-0[b]	none	none	appeal from the California Supreme Court (Cal.)	judgment affirmed
United States v. Esnault-Pelterie	299 U.S. 201 (1936)	Butler	8-0[b]	none	none	certiorari to the United States Court of Claims (Ct. Cl.)	judgment vacated, and cause remanded
United States v. Resnick	299 U.S. 207 (1936)	Butler	8-0[b]	none	none	appeal from the United States District Court for the Eastern District of Pennsylvania (E.D. Pa.)	judgments affirmed
National Home for Disabled Volunteer Soldiers v. Wood	299 U.S. 211 (1936)	Butler	8-0[b]	none	none	certiorari to the United States Court of Appeals for the Seventh Circuit (7th Cir.)	decree affirmed
Pufahl v. Estate of Parks	299 U.S. 217 (1936)	Roberts	8-0[b]	none	none	certiorari to the Illinois Appellate Court (Ill. App. Ct.)	judgment affirmed
American Telephone and Telegraph v. United States	299 U.S. 232 (1936)	Cardozo	8-0[b]	none	none	appeal from the United States District Court for the Southern District of New York (S.D.N.Y.)	decree affirmed
Landis v. North American Company	299 U.S. 248 (1936)	Cardozo	8-0[b]	McReynolds (without opinion)	none	certiorari to the United States Court of Appeals for the District of Columbia (D.C. Cir.)	decrees reversed, and causes remanded
Duke Power Company v. Greenwood County	299 U.S. 259 (1936)	per curiam	8-0[b]	none	none	certiorari to the United States Court of Appeals for the Fourth Circuit (4th Cir.)	decree reversed
KVOS, Inc. v. Associated Press	299 U.S. 269 (1936)	Roberts	8-0[b]	none	none	certiorari to the United States Court of Appeals for the Ninth Circuit (9th Cir.)	decree reversed, and cause remanded
Binney v. Long, Commissioner of Corporations and Taxes of Massachusetts	299 U.S. 280 (1936)	Roberts	6-2[b]	none	Cardozo (opinion; joined by Brandeis)	appeal from the Massachusetts Probate Court for Norfolk County (Norfolk Cnty. Prob. Ct.)	judgment reversed, and cause remanded
Kroger Grocery and Baking Company v. Lutz, Attorney General of Indiana	299 U.S. 300 (1936)	per curiam	8-0[b]	none	none	appeal from the United States District Court for the Northern District of Indiana (N.D. Ind.)	decree affirmed
Kammerer v. Kroeger, Superintendent of Building and Loan Associations of Ohio	299 U.S. 302 (1936)	per curiam	8-0[b]	none	none	appeal from the Ohio Supreme Court (Ohio)	appeals dismissed
United States v. Curtiss-Wright Export Corp.	299 U.S. 304 (1936)	Sutherland	7-1[b]	none	McReynolds (without opinion)	appeal from the United States District Court for the Southern District of New York (S.D.N.Y.)	judgment reversed, and cause remanded
Kentucky Whip and Collar Company v. Illinois Central Railroad Company	299 U.S. 334 (1937)	Hughes	8-0[b]	none	none	certiorari to the United States Court of Appeals for the Sixth Circuit (6th Cir.)	decree affirmed
De Jonge v. Oregon	299 U.S. 353 (1937)	Hughes	8-0[b]	none	none	appeal from the Oregon Supreme Court (Or.)	judgment reversed, and cause remanded
New York ex rel. Whitney v. Graves	299 U.S. 366 (1937)	Hughes	8-0[b]	none	none	appeal from the New York Supreme Court (N.Y. Sup. Ct.)	judgment affirmed
Employers Reinsurance Corporation v. Bryant, U.S. District Judge	299 U.S. 374 (1937)	VanDevanter	8-0[b]	none	none	certiorari to the United States Court of Appeals for the Fifth Circuit (5th Cir.)	judgment affirmed
Liggett and Myers Tobacco Company v. United States	299 U.S. 383 (1937)	McReynolds	8-0[b]	none	none	certiorari to the United States Court of Claims (Ct. Cl.)	judgment affirmed
Hauge v. City of Chicago	299 U.S. 387 (1937)	McReynolds	8-0[b]	none	none	appeal from the Illinois Supreme Court (Ill.)	judgment affirmed
W.P. Brown and Sons Lumber Company v. Louisville and Nashville Railroad Company	299 U.S. 393 (1937)	Brandeis	8-0[b]	none	none	certiorari to the United States Court of Appeals for the Sixth Circuit (6th Cir.)	judgment affirmed
New York ex rel. Rogers v. Graves	299 U.S. 401 (1937)	Sutherland	8-0[b]	none	none	appeal from the New York Supreme Court (N.Y. Sup. Ct.)	judgment reversed, and cause remanded
Bengzon v. Secretary of Justice of the Philippine Islands	299 U.S. 410 (1937)	Sutherland	8-0[b]	none	none	certiorari to the Supreme Court of the Philippines (Phil.)	judgment reversed, and cause remanded
United States v. Seminole Nation	299 U.S. 417 (1937)	Butler	8-0[b]	none	none	certiorari to the United States Court of Claims (Ct. Cl.)	judgment reversed, and cause remanded
City Bank Farmers Trust Company v. Irving Trust Company	299 U.S. 433 (1937)	Roberts	7-0[b][d]	none	none	certiorari to the United States Court of Appeals for the Second Circuit (2d Cir.)	judgment reversed, and cause remanded
Kuehner v. Irving Trust Company	299 U.S. 445 (1937)	Roberts	7-0[b][d]	none	none	certiorari to the United States Court of Appeals for the Second Circuit (2d Cir.)	judgment affirmed
Schwartz v. Irving Trust Company	299 U.S. 456 (1937)	Roberts	7-0[b][d]	none	none	certiorari to the United States Court of Appeals for the Second Circuit (2d Cir.)	judgment reversed, and cause remanded
Meadows v. Irving Trust Company	299 U.S. 464 (1937)	Roberts	7-0[b][d]	none	none	certiorari to the United States Court of Appeals for the Second Circuit (2d Cir.)	judgment affirmed
Shapleigh v. Mier	299 U.S. 468 (1937)	Cardozo	8-0[b]	none	none	certiorari to the United States Court of Appeals for the Fifth Circuit (5th Cir.)	judgment affirmed
Shoshone Tribe of Indians v. United States	299 U.S. 476 (1937)	Cardozo	8-0[b]	none	none	certiorari to the United States Court of Claims (Ct. Cl.)	judgment reversed, and cause remanded
United States v. Hudson	299 U.S. 498 (1937)	VanDevanter	8-0[b]	none	none	certiorari to the United States Court of Claims (Ct. Cl.)	judgment reversed

[a] VanDevanter took no part in the case
[b] Stone took no part in the case (Stone missed numerous cases listed above due to illness)
[c] Roberts took no part in the case
[d] Brandeis took no part in the case
