= United States v. Curtiss-Wright Export Corp. =

1936 U.S. Supreme Court decision

- Supreme Court of the United States

Argued November 19–20, 1936 Decided December 21, 1936
- Full case name: United States v. Curtiss-Wright Export Corporation et al.
- Citations: 299 U.S. 304 (more) 57 S. Ct. 216; 81 L. Ed. 255; 1936 U.S. LEXIS 968

Case history
- Prior: Judgment sustaining a demurrer to the indictment, 14 F. Supp. 230 (D.D.C. 1932); probable jurisdiction noted, 57 S. Ct. 14 (1936).

Questions presented
- Did the joint resolution passed by Congress grant unconstitutional authority and legislative power to the President in violation of the non-delegation doctrine?; Was the President required by considerations of due process to make findings of fact in support of the proclamation?; Did the revocation of the May 1934 proclamation eliminate the penalty for its violation?

Holding
- The Constitution does not explicitly prescribe that foreign policy is entirely vested with the President so much as it does implicitly prescribe that foreign policy is entirely vested with the President. Diplomacy entails that there are ways in which the President is able to act and in which Congress is unable to act.

Court membership
- Chief Justice Charles E. Hughes Associate Justices Willis Van Devanter · James C. McReynolds; Louis Brandeis · George Sutherland; Pierce Butler · Harlan F. Stone; Owen Roberts · Benjamin N. Cardozo

Case opinions
- Majority: Sutherland, joined by Hughes, Van Devanter, Brandeis, Butler, Roberts, Cardozo
- Dissent: McReynolds
- Stone took no part in the consideration or decision of the case.

United States v. Curtiss-Wright Export Corp., 299 U.S. 304 (1936), is a landmark decision of the Supreme Court of the United States concerning foreign affairs, in which the Supreme Court held that the president has primacy with respect to, and that federal government has broad authority over, foreign affairs.

== Background ==
In June 1932, the Chaco War broke out between Paraguay and Bolivia. Both belligerents were poor and relied on outside military assistance, which aroused interest among American armament manufacturers. However, in response to national antiwar sentiment, widespread revulsion at the conduct of the war, and diplomatic pressure from the United Kingdom and the League of Nations, the US government sought to terminate any developing arms trade.

To that end, on May 24, 1934, the US Congress approved a joint resolution providing that "if the President finds that the prohibition of the sale of arms and munitions of war in the United States to those countries engaged in conflict in the Chaco may contribute to the establishment of peace between those countries," he was authorized to proclaim an embargo on American arms shipments to the belligerents with violators subject to a fine, imprisonment, or both. The same day, US President Franklin Roosevelt signed the joint resolution and issued a proclamation reaffirming its language and establishing an embargo. On November 14, 1935, that proclamation was revoked.

Curtiss-Wright Export Corp. was indicted for violating both the joint resolution and the embargo by conspiring to sell aircraft machine guns to Bolivia. It demurred to the indictment by arguing that the embargo and proclamation were void, as Congress had unconstitutionally delegated legislative power to the executive branch and thus given the President "unfettered discretion" to make a decision that should have been determined by Congress. The lower court agreed.

== Issues ==
The defendant raised several issues for consideration by the Court:

1. Did the joint resolution passed by Congress grant unconstitutional authority and legislative power to the President in violation of the non-delegation doctrine?
2. Was the President required by considerations of due process to make findings of fact in support of the proclamation?
3. Did the revocation of the May 1934 proclamation eliminate the penalty for its violation?

== Decision ==
In a 7-1 decision authored by Justice George Sutherland, the Court ruled that the U.S. government, through the President, is categorically allowed great foreign affairs powers that are independent of the US Constitution:

The ["powers of the federal government in respect of foreign or external affairs and those in respect of domestic or internal affairs"] are different, both in respect of their origin and their nature. The broad statement that the federal government can exercise no powers except those specifically enumerated in the Constitution, and such implied powers as are necessary and proper to carry into effect the enumerated powers, is categorically true only in respect of our internal affairs.

The Constitution does not explicitly state that all ability to conduct foreign policy is vested in the President, but the Court concluded that such power is given implicitly since the executive of a sovereign nation is by its very nature empowered to conduct foreign affairs:

Moreover, he, not Congress, has the better opportunity of knowing the conditions which prevail in foreign countries, and especially is this true in time of war. He has his confidential sources of information. He has his agents in the form of diplomatic, consular and other officials. Secrecy in respect of information gathered by them may be highly necessary, and the premature disclosure of it productive of harmful results.

The Court found "sufficient warrant for the broad discretion vested in the President to determine whether the enforcement of the statute will have a beneficial effect upon the reestablishment of peace in the affected countries." In other words, the President is better suited to determine the actions and the policies that best serve the nation's interests abroad:

It is important to bear in mind that we are here dealing not alone with an authority vested in the President by an exertion of legislative power, but with such an authority plus the very delicate, plenary and exclusive power of the President as the sole organ of the federal government in the field of international relations–a power which does not require as a basis for its exercise an act of Congress, but which, of course, like every other governmental power, must be exercised in subordination to the applicable provisions of the Constitution.

By contrast, Congress lacks such an inherent role under the Constitution, which accords broad discretion to the President alone because of the vastness and the complexity of international relations.

== Legacy ==
The ruling not only upheld export limitations on the grounds of national security but also established the broader principle of executive supremacy in national security and in foreign affairs; this was one of the reasons advanced in the 1950s for the nearly successful attempt to add the Bricker Amendment to the U.S. Constitution.

The Court has not recognized the full scope of executive power suggested by Justice Sutherland's sweeping language; consequently, it has sometimes presented contradictory rulings about foreign policy powers between the President and the Congress. In Federal Energy Administration v. Algonquin SNG, Inc. (1976), the Court validated presidential restrictions on oil imports based on the very broad congressional language that delegated apparently unlimited regulatory authority to the executive branch in government.

Despite its controversy, Curtiss-Wright is among the Supreme Court's most influential decisions. Most cases involving conflicts between the executive and legislative branches involve political questions that the courts refuse to adjudicate. Therefore, the sweeping language of Curtiss-Wright is regularly cited to support the executive branch's claims of power to act without congressional authorization in foreign affairs, especially if there is no judicial intervention to interpret the text's meaning. However, the Supreme Court in the 2015 Zivotofsky v. Kerry decision made clear that Curtiss-Wright was incorrect in describing presidential power over foreign affairs as "plenary and exclusive". The Court in Zivotofsky wrote that: "United States v. Curtiss-Wright Export Corp., 299 U. S. 304, 320, does not support a broader definition of the Executive’s power over foreign relations that would permit the President alone to determine the whole content of the Nation’s foreign policy. The Executive is not free from the ordinary controls and checks of Congress merely because foreign affairs are at issue."

In a 2023 paper Curtis Bradley and Jack Goldsmith called Curtiss-Wright "the foundational decision in support of a foreign affairs exception to the nondelegation doctrine".

== See also ==
- List of United States Supreme Court cases, volume 299
- Little v. Barreme
