= 1824 Georgia popular vote referendum =

- October 5, 1824
- Outcome: Popular election of presidential electors adopted for elections after 1824

Results
Choice	Votes	%
People	19,999	70.92%
Legislature	8,199	29.08%
Total votes	28,198	100.00%
County results
People
50–60%
60–70%
70–80%
80–90%
90–100%
Legislature
50–60%
60–70%
70–80%
80–90%
90–100%
Other
No data
Cherokee and Muscogee territory

A legislatively referred referendum on whether the US state of Georgia should adopt the popular election of presidential electors was held on October 5, 1824, concurrently with legislative elections to the general assembly. The proposal received substantial support with 70.92% of voters supporting the change.

Unlike the 1823 bill that authorized popular elections for governor, the bill to adopt the popular election of presidential electors for 1824 proved to be divisive as election day was only a year away. The Crawford party-controlled legislature eventually opted for a referendum on the issue for presidential elections after 1824, killing the Clark party supported bill.

== Background ==
During this time, political divisions in the state fell along the lines of personal support for outstanding leaders in their struggle for power. Many of these factions were usually held together through personal friendships and family associations. The two factions at the time were the Clark faction, followers of Governor John Clark, and the Crawford faction, followers of Secretary of the Treasury William H. Crawford.

During the 1823 legislative session, there was a growing push among grand juries and newspaper correspondents for electoral reform. This movement was supported by Clark and his party, who advocated for the popular election of both the governor and presidential electors. The legislature considered two bills regarding gubernatorial elections: one allowing the people to choose gubernatorial electors and the other permitting them to vote directly for the governor. Ultimately, the legislature chose the latter bill.

A companion bill to adopt the popular election of presidential electors for the 1824 election proved to be more divisive as election day was only a year away. The Crawford party-controlled legislature eventually opted for a referendum on the issue for presidential elections after 1824, killing the Clark party supported bill. According to the Clark party newspaper the Georgia Patriot “not a single individual who voted for Troup [for Governor], or who is favorable to William H. Crawford as President of the United States, voted for the bill giving the election of electors to the people!”

Clarkites accused the change as a parliamentary maneuver enabling the Crawford party to defeat the will of the people once more, briefly branding themselves as the "People’s Men" and their party slate as the "People’s Ticket."

== Results ==
7,777 voters did not vote on the referendum.

1824 Georgia popular vote referendum
Choice	Votes	%
For	19,999	70.92
Against	8,199	29.08
Total	28,198	100.00
