= Bourdieu v. Pacific Western Oil Co. =

- Supreme Court of the United States

Argued October 12, 1936 Decided November 9, 1936
- Full case name: Bourdieu v. Pacific Western Oil Co.
- Citations: 299 U.S. 65 (more) 57 S. Ct. 51; 81 L. Ed. 42

Holding
- An inquiry into indispensability would be unnecessary where the complaint did not state a cause of action.

Court membership
- Chief Justice Charles E. Hughes Associate Justices Willis Van Devanter · James C. McReynolds; Louis Brandeis · George Sutherland; Pierce Butler · Harlan F. Stone; Owen Roberts · Benjamin N. Cardozo

Case opinion
- Majority: Sutherland, joined by Van Devanter, McReynolds, Brandeis, Butler, Roberts, Cardozo
- Stone took no part in the consideration or decision of the case.

Bourdieu v. Pacific Western Oil Co., 299 U.S. 65 (1936), was a decision by the United States Supreme Court, which held that an inquiry into indispensability would be unnecessary where the complaint did not state a cause of action.

== Background ==
Pacific Western Oil Corporation was established by Edward L. Doherty in 1928 before later coming under the control of J. Paul Getty and owned oil and gas drilling rights for large sections of Fresno County, California. An agricultural landowner had "mining" rights for the same area and sued. The oil companies asserted that, since their leases were issued by the United States Secretary of State, that they could not be sued without including the U.S. government but the court disagreed.

== See also ==
- List of United States Supreme Court cases, volume 299
