= American Insurance Co. v. Canter =

American Insurance Company v. Canter
- Supreme Court of the United States

Argued March 8, 10–11, 1828 Decided March 15, 1828
- Full case name: The American Insurance Company, and The Ocean Insurance Company, (of New-York,) v. 356 Bales of Cotton, David Canter
- Citations: 26 U.S. 511 (more) 1 Pet. 511; 7 L. Ed. 242; 1828 WL 2951 (U.S.S.C.)

Case history
- Prior: From the Circuit Court of the United States, District of South Carolina

Holding
- A legislative court that is not organized under Article III can be competent to use admiralty jurisdiction if Congress authorizes it to do so in its authorizing statute.

Court membership
- Chief Justice John Marshall Associate Justices Bushrod Washington · William Johnson; Gabriel Duvall · Joseph Story; Smith Thompson · Robert Trimble

Case opinion
- Majority: Marshall, joined by unanimous

American Insurance Company v. Canter, 26 U.S. (1 Pet.) 511 (1828), was a case decided by the Supreme Court of the United States. The case involved the validity of a local court established by Congress in the Florida Territory whose judges lacked life tenure, as mandated by Article III of the Constitution. Chief Justice John Marshall upheld the courts on the basis of Congress's broad power to enact local laws for territories under Article IV, Section 3, Clause 2 of the Constitution. The case was later discussed in Dred Scott v. Sandford, where Chief Justice Roger Taney distinguished it in holding that Congress could not ban slavery within a territory.

Marshall's textual interpretation of the Constitution leading to his conclusion that it authorizes Congress to create United States territorial courts has been criticized as "fatuous". However, the conclusion itself is widely recognized as correct for a variety of reasons stated more clearly by others.

The full name of the case also makes it proper to call this case American Insurance Company v. 356 Bales of Cotton. This occasionally receives attention for sounding unusual.
