= Ex parte Madrazzo =

- Supreme Court of the United States

Decided February 28, 1833
- Full case name: Ex parte Juan Madrazzo
- Citations: 32 U.S. 627 (more) 7 Pet. 627; 8 L. Ed. 808; 1833 U.S. LEXIS 366

Case history
- Prior: Original

Court membership
- Chief Justice John Marshall Associate Justices William Johnson · Gabriel Duvall; Joseph Story · Smith Thompson; John McLean · Henry Baldwin

Case opinion
- Majority: Marshall, joined by unanimous

Ex parte Madrazzo, 32 U.S. (7 Pet.) 627 (1833), was a US Supreme Court case involving the suit of Juan Madrazo, a Spanish citizen, against the State of Georgia.

== Background ==
Madrazo was on his second encounter with the US court system. His ship Isabelita was originally captured by a ship flying under the flag of Amelia, a colony in revolt from the Kingdom of Spain that had received no international recognition and was run mainly by Americans.

A court in that country deemed the capture of the Isabelita and her cargo of slaves to be legal booty and sold them to William Bowen. Bowen later transported the slaves to the Creek nation, where they were captured in Georgia. After their capture, Georgia Governor John Clark ordered some of them to be sold, and the others remained in his possession.

After a round of suits in the district court of Georgia, Madrazo filed a suit in the circuit court on appeal. It was argued whether the district court had jurisdiction of the case. The circuit court ruled that to be the case and restored the slaves to Madrazo. Georgia appealed to the Supreme Court on the basis that the case was not one of admiralty but against the state, which would give Madrazo no grounds for a case because of the Eleventh Amendment.

Marshall wrote in his opinion of Governor of Georgia v. Madrazo, that Madrazo's claim against the governor was against a state because the governor was acting in his official office. Also, the claim did not have any basis because of the Eleventh Amendment, which forbids cases of law or equity against a state.

Marshall found a loophole that the Eleventh Amendment of the Constitution exempts cases of admiralty, which are of the Supreme Court's original jurisdiction.

== Decision ==
The Supreme Court dismissed the case and found the property not to be in the jurisdiction of a court of admiralty or in the possession of a private person. The governor was not a private person but in possession of the State of Georgia. Therefore, Madrazo's case was a suit of law or equity and so could not stand.

== See also ==
- List of United States Supreme Court cases, volume 32
