= Bailiff v. Tipping =

- Supreme Court of the United States

Decided February 25, 1805
- Full case name: Bailiff v. Tipping
- Citations: 6 U.S. 406 (more) 2 Cranch 406; 2 L. Ed. 320; 1805 U.S. LEXIS 284

Holding
- A writ of error must have a citation.

Court membership
- Chief Justice John Marshall Associate Justices William Cushing · William Paterson; Samuel Chase · Bushrod Washington; William Johnson

Case opinion
- Majority: no opinion issued

Bailiff v. Tipping, 6 U.S. (2 Cranch) 406 (1805), was a United States Supreme Court case in which the Court held that a citation must accompany a writ of error in order for the court to hear the case.

== Background ==
In the older common law procedure, a writ of error was a writ issued by an appellate court directing a lower court to deliver the record in the case for review. It was the most common form of remedial process available to the losing party after the final determination of the case on its merits. Similarly in the older common law context, a citation was a court-issued writ commanding a person to appear at a certain time and place in order to do something demanded in the writ, or to show cause for not doing something demanded.

At issue was whether the courts of the United States have jurisdiction to hear a case in which one alien sues another alien.

The Circuit Court for the District of Kentucky held that the courts did not have jurisdiction in a case where the parties were both aliens. There was a writ of error to the Supreme Court.

== Opinion of the Court ==
Where the writ of error lacks a citation, the writ of error must be dismissed. But see Mason v. Ship Blaireau (6 U.S. 240, 2 Cranch 240) for a case deciding the question of whether the courts of the United States may hear a case in which the parties are both aliens.
