= Barron v. Baltimore =

1833 U.S. Supreme Court case on the scope of the Bill of Rights

- Supreme Court of the United States

Argued February 11, 1833 Decided February 16, 1833
- Full case name: John Barron, survivor of John Craig, for the use of Luke Tiernan, Executor of John Craig v. The Mayor and City Council of Baltimore
- Citations: 32 U.S. 243 (more) 7 Pet. 243; 8 L. Ed. 672

Case history
- Prior: Accepted on writ of error to the Court of Appeals for the Western Shore of the State of Maryland.

Holding
- State governments are not bound by the Bill of Rights.

Court membership
- Chief Justice John Marshall Associate Justices William Johnson · Gabriel Duvall; Joseph Story · Smith Thompson; John McLean · Henry Baldwin

Case opinion
- Majority: Marshall, joined by unanimous
- Superseded by
- U.S. Const. amend. XIV

Barron v. Baltimore, 32 U.S. (7 Pet.) 243 (1833), is a landmark United States Supreme Court case in 1833, which helped define the concept of federalism in US constitutional law. The Court ruled that the Bill of Rights did not apply to the state governments, establishing a precedent until the ratification of the Fourteenth Amendment to the United States Constitution. The case is also significant for highlighting the separation between federal government and state government.

== Background ==
The city of Baltimore, Maryland, initiated a public works project that involved the modification of several streams that emptied into Baltimore Harbor. City construction resulted in large amounts of sediment being deposited into the streams, which then emptied into the harbor near a profitable wharf owned and operated by John Barron. The material settled into the water near the wharf, decreasing the depth of the water to a point where it was nearly impossible for ships to approach it. As it was no longer easily accessible for ships, the business's profitability declined substantially. Barron sued the City of Baltimore for losses, arguing that he was deprived of his property without the due process afforded him by the Fifth Amendment. Barron was awarded $4,500 in compensation by the trial court, but a Maryland appellate court reversed the decision.

== Decision ==
The Supreme Court heard arguments on the case on February 8 and 11 and decided on February 16, 1833. It held that the Bill of Rights, such as the Fifth Amendment's guarantee of just compensation for takings of private property for public use, are restrictions on the federal government alone. Writing for a unanimous court, Chief Justice John Marshall held that the first ten "amendments contain no expression indicating an intention to apply them to the State governments. This court cannot so apply them."

To demonstrate that Constitutional limits did not apply to states unless expressly stated, Marshall used the example of Article I, Sections 9 and 10:

The third clause (of Section 9), for example, declares that "no bill of attainder or ex post facto law shall be passed." No language can be more general; yet the demonstration is complete that it applies solely to the government of the United States. ... the succeeding section, the avowed purpose of which is to restrain state legislation ... declares that "no state shall pass any bill of attainder or ex post facto law." This provision, then, of the ninth section, however comprehensive its language, contains no restriction on state legislation.

== Aftermath ==
The case was particularly important in terms of American government because it stated that the Bill of Rights did not restrict the state governments.

The decision was initially ignored by the growing abolitionist movement, some of whom maintained that Congress could constitutionally abolish slavery, under the Bill of Rights. The case was largely unknown in the 1860s; during a debate in Congress on the Fourteenth Amendment, Congressman John Bingham had to read part of Marshall's opinion aloud to the Senate.

Later Supreme Court rulings would return to Barron to reaffirm its central holding, most notably in United States v. Cruikshank, 92 U.S. 542 (1876). However, since the early 20th century, the Supreme Court has used the Due Process Clause of the Fourteenth Amendment, which was interpreted to have the same meaning as the Fifth Amendment, to apply most of the Bill of Rights to the states by selective incorporation. Therefore, as to most of the Bill of Rights, Barron and its progeny have been circumvented, if not actually overruled.
