= Green v. Biddle =

- Supreme Court of the United States

Decided February 17, 1823
- Full case name: Green and Others v. Biddle
- Citations: 21 U.S. 1 (more) 8 Wheat. 1; 5 L. Ed. 547

Holding
- Legislation by the state of Kentucky restricting the rights of titleholders to land in that state, but originally granted by the state of Virginia prior to Kentucky statehood, unconstitutionally violates Virginia's right to sovereignty.

Court membership
- Chief Justice John Marshall Associate Justices Bushrod Washington · William Johnson; H. Brockholst Livingston · Thomas Todd; Gabriel Duvall · Joseph Story

Case opinions
- Majority: Story
- Majority: Washington (rehearing denial)
- Dissent: Johnson

Laws applied
- Article Four of the United States Constitution

Green v. Biddle, 21 U.S. (8 Wheat.) 1 (1823), is a 6-to-1 ruling by the Supreme Court of the United States that held that the state of Virginia had properly entered into a compact with the United States federal government under Clause One of Article Four of the United States Constitution. This compact surrendered Virginia's claim to the area that eventually became the state of Kentucky, but imposed restrictions on Kentucky's ability to upset title to land sold or otherwise granted by the state of Virginia at the time of the compact. The Supreme Court held that legislation enacted by Kentucky that restricted these rights unconstitutionally infringed on Virginia's right to surrender the land in accordance with Article Four, Clause One.

== Background ==
During European colonization of the Americas, James I of England granted the Charter of 1606 to the newly established Virginia Company, asserting royal title to Native American-occupied land between the 34th and 45th latitudes and 100 miles (160 km) inland, and permitting the Virginia Company to establish colonies there. In 1609, James I redefined the Colony of Virginia's boundaries to extend the colonies northern and southern boundaries as well as asserting title to all land west to the Pacific Ocean. Conflicting land claims as well as claims that land grants extended to the Pacific Ocean proved highly contentious issues after the American Revolution. To help resolve the issue, in 1781 Virginia agreed to surrender to the United States federal government all title to its land claims west of the Ohio River.

In the compact between Virginia and the United States under which Virginia surrendered its territory was the following clause (ellipsis in original):

That all private rights and interests of lands within the said district [of Kentucky] derived from the laws of Virginia prior to such separation shall remain valid and secure under the laws of the proposed state, and shall be determined by the laws now existing in this state.

Title was transferred in 1784, and the Congress of the Confederation passed the Land Ordinance of 1784, Land Ordinance of 1785, and the Northwest Ordinance to turn these lands into territories and (eventually) states. In 1792, after 10 constitutional conventions and three statehood enabling acts passed by the Virginia legislature, Kentucky was admitted as a state on June 1, 1792. The terms of the Virginia-U.S. compact regarding title to land was included in the Constitution of Kentucky.

On February 27, 1797, the state of Kentucky passed legislation protecting individuals who had title to their land stripped from them due to improper conveyance. In part, the legislation: 1) Absolved the former titleholder from paying any rent or profits accrued while improper title was held (e.g., mesne profits); 2) Held the successful claimant liable to the former titleholder for any improvements made to the property; and 3) In the case where improvements exceeded the value of the unimproved land, the successful claimant could return the property to the former titleholder without paying the balance or the successful claimant could keep the property but was required to post a bond and warranty until the value of the improvements was paid.

On January 31, 1812, Kentucky again passed legislation protecting individuals who had title to their land stripped from them due to improper conveyance. This second legislation, in part: 1) Required successful claimants to pay to ejected titleholders, 2) The successful claimant may avoid paying the value of the improvements by relinquishing the land and accepting payment in the amount of the value of the unimproved property instead, or may keep the land (but must post bond and warranty if the value of improvements exceeds three-fourths of the value of the unimproved property); 3) The ejected titleholder is responsible for paying rents and profits on the property after judgment against him, but only up to a period not to exceed five years after the ruling against him; and 4) Courts must ascertain the value of land, rents, and profits in such cases.

The heirs of John Green sued Richard Biddle to reclaim title to certain land in the state of Kentucky.

== Ruling ==
=== Majority opinion ===
Associate Justice Joseph Story delivered the opinion of the Court.

For the majority, the primary question was whether the two Kentucky legislative acts were constitutional. Justice Story conceded that each state has the sovereign right to determine the legal structure under which property may be conveyed and title settled. That right was exercised by Virginia when it agreed to the compact surrendering its lands to the United States, however, and that compact declared "in the most explicit terms that all private rights and interests of lands, derived from the laws of Virginia, shall remain valid and secure under the laws of Kentucky, and shall be determined by the laws then existing in Virginia." The question before the Court, then, was whether the acts of 1797 and 1812 restricted titleholders' rights enumerated under Virginia law at the time the compact entered into force in 1784. Story concluded for the majority that those rights were restricted, holding that the Kentucky legislation was an unconstitutional infringement on Virginia's sovereign rights (as defined in the compact).

Justice Bushrod Washington did not participate in this decision.

=== Majority opinion on rehearing ===
Kentucky moved for an immediate rehearing. Justice Washington participated in the decision of the Court, and delivered the decision of the Court. Justice Washington reviewed the pertinent legislative language in the 1797 and 1812 Kentucky acts. The similarities and differences between the Kentucky acts (on the one hand) and Virginia law and European and developing American common law (on the other) were compared and contrasted. However, he concluded, the Kentucky acts restricted titleholders' rights and imposed duties and responsibilities on them that Virginia law and court decisions did not contain.

Justice Washington then reviewed two additional claims: 1) That the Kentucky acts were unconstitutional for Congress had not assented to Virginia's restrictions upon that state, and 2) That the Kentucky acts violated Virginia's sovereignty over the land previously held by it and surrendered only until terms of the compact of 1784. The first claim, Washington observed, was based on the idea that Congress had not given its explicit consent to specific article in question in the compact. He rejected this argument, concluding that "the act of Congress [was] not ... a mere tacit acquiescence, but ... an express declaration of the legislative mind, resulting from the manifest construction of the act itself." Therefore, with congressional assent, Virginia had been able to constitutionally impose restrictions on Kentucky. As to the second claim, the majority held that the Constitution specifically barred any attempt to impair the obligations of contract. "Kentucky, therefore, being a party to the compact which guaranteed to claimants of land lying in that state under titles derived from Virginia their rights as they existed under the laws of Virginia, was incompetent to violate that contract by passing any law which rendered those rights less valid and secure."

=== Dissenting opinion ===
Associate Justice William Johnson dissented.

To Johnson, the first question was whether the Kentucky acts were constitutional. If constitutional, which act should be applied? The suit was filed after the legislation of 1797 was enacted, but before the legislation of 1812 was enacted.

Johnson declined to rule on the first question, as it had not been raised on appeal. He did feel compelled to comment on one aspect of the case, however. Kentucky had argued that it had recognized Virginia's 1784 compact as a compact, but not as fundamental law. Was this true? In dicta, Johnson argued that this provision of the Kentucky constitution did not limit Kentucky's sovereignty over its own land. To conclude that Congress, Kentucky, and Virginia had so intended would lead to a particularly undesirable result: "This would be cutting deep indeed into the sovereign powers of Kentucky, and would be establishing the anomaly of a territory over which no government could legislate—not Virginia, for she had parted with the sovereignty; not Kentucky, for the laws of Virginia were irrevocably fastened upon two-thirds of her territory."

So was the Kentucky constitution meaningless? Johnson said no. There were two possible interpretations, he suggested. The first was that the Kentucky lands were not "land" in the legal sense, as no state yet existed to cover them, but that Virginia intended for titleholders in the area to have their rights protected to a great degree as if they held title to actual land. A second interpretation viewed Virginia's stipulations as similar to those nations imposed on each another to protect basic rights (such as the right to recover goods from a wreck or pirate). Such stipulations could not go so far as to deny Kentucky the right to regulate title and conveyance to its lands, nor to seize land for public purpose in return for fair compensation (as is every sovereign state's right).

But Johnson reluctantly agreed that abandoning strict construction of the Kentucky constitution left the Court afloat "on a sea of uncertainty as to the extent of the legislative power of Kentucky over the territory held under Virginia grants..."

Johnson concluded that, if forced to choose between strict construction and uncertainty, that he would opt for uncertainty. Resolving this uncertainty was not, however, a question properly before the Supreme Court, and should be resolved by the political arena.

== Bibliography ==
- Ayers, Edward L.; Gould, Lewis L.; Oshinsky, David M.; and Soderland, Jean R. American Passages: A History of the United States. Boston, Mass.: Wadsworth/Cengage Learning, 2009.
- Harrison, Lowell Hayes. Kentucky's Road to Statehood. Lexington, Ky.: University Press of Kentucky, 1992.
- Hubbard, Bill. American Boundaries: The Nation, the States, the Rectangular Survey. Chicago: University of Chicago Press, 2009.
- Miller, Robert J. Native America, Discovered and Conquered: Thomas Jefferson, Lewis & Clark, and Manifest Destiny. Westport, Conn.: Praeger Publishers, 2006.
