= List of United States Supreme Court cases, volume 16 =

Supreme Court of the United States
- Interactive map of Supreme Court of the United States
- 38°53′26″N 77°00′16″W
- Established: March 4, 1789; 237 years ago
- Location: Washington, D.C.
- Coordinates: 38°53′26″N 77°00′16″W
- Composition method: Presidential nomination with Senate confirmation
- Authorised by: Constitution of the United States, Art. III, § 1
- Judge term length: life tenure, subject to impeachment and removal
- Number of positions: 9 (by statute)
- Website: supremecourt.gov

This is a list of cases reported in volume 16 (3 Wheat.) of United States Reports, decided by the Supreme Court of the United States in 1818.

== Nominative reports ==
In 1874, the U.S. government created the United States Reports, and retroactively numbered older privately published case reports as part of the new series. As a result, cases appearing in volumes 1–90 of U.S. Reports have dual citation forms; one for the volume number of U.S. Reports, and one for the volume number of the reports named for the relevant reporter of decisions (these are called "nominative reports").

=== Henry Wheaton ===
Starting with the 14th volume of U.S. Reports, the Reporter of Decisions of the Supreme Court of the United States was Henry Wheaton. Wheaton was Reporter of Decisions from 1816 to 1827, covering volumes 14 through 25 of United States Reports which correspond to volumes 1 through 12 of his Wheaton's Reports. As such, the dual form of citation to, for example, Craig v. Radford is 16 U.S. (3 Wheat.) 594 (1818).

== Justices of the Supreme Court at the time of 16 U.S. (3 Wheat.) ==
The Supreme Court is established by Article III, Section 1 of the Constitution of the United States, which says: "The judicial Power of the United States, shall be vested in one supreme Court . . .". The size of the Court is not specified; the Constitution leaves it to Congress to set the number of justices. Under the Judiciary Act of 1789 Congress originally fixed the number of justices at six (one chief justice and five associate justices). Since 1789 Congress has varied the size of the Court from six to seven, nine, ten, and back to nine justices (always including one chief justice).

When the cases in 16 U.S. (3 Wheat.) were decided, the Court comprised these seven justices:

Portrait	Justice	Office	Home State	Succeeded	Date confirmed by the Senate (Vote)	Tenure on Supreme Court
	John Marshall	Chief Justice	Virginia	Oliver Ellsworth	January 27, 1801 (Acclamation)	February 4, 1801 – July 6, 1835 (Died)
	Bushrod Washington	Associate Justice	Virginia	James Wilson	December 20, 1798 (Acclamation)	November 9, 1798 (Recess Appointment) – November 26, 1829 (Died)
	William Johnson	Associate Justice	South Carolina	Alfred Moore	March 24, 1804 (Acclamation)	May 7, 1804 – August 4, 1834 (Died)
	Henry Brockholst Livingston	Associate Justice	New York	William Paterson	December 17, 1806 (Acclamation)	January 20, 1807 – March 18, 1823 (Died)
	Thomas Todd	Associate Justice	Kentucky	new seat	March 2, 1807 (Acclamation)	March 3, 1807 – February 7, 1826 (Died)
	Gabriel Duvall	Associate Justice	Maryland	Samuel Chase	November 18, 1811 (Acclamation)	November 23, 1811 – January 12, 1835 (Resigned)
	Joseph Story	Associate Justice	Massachusetts	William Cushing	November 18, 1811 (Acclamation)	February 3, 1812 – September 10, 1845 (Died)

== Citation style ==
Under the Judiciary Act of 1789 the federal court structure at the time comprised District Courts, which had general trial jurisdiction; Circuit Courts, which had mixed trial and appellate (from the US District Courts) jurisdiction; and the United States Supreme Court, which had appellate jurisdiction over the federal District and Circuit courts—and for certain issues over state courts. The Supreme Court also had limited original jurisdiction (i.e., in which cases could be filed directly with the Supreme Court without first having been heard by a lower federal or state court). There were one or more federal District Courts and/or Circuit Courts in each state, territory, or other geographical region.

Bluebook citation style is used for case names, citations, and jurisdictions.

- "C.C.D." = United States Circuit Court for the District of . . .
  - e.g.,"C.C.D.N.J." = United States Circuit Court for the District of New Jersey
- "D." = United States District Court for the District of . . .
  - e.g.,"D. Mass." = United States District Court for the District of Massachusetts
- "E." = Eastern; "M." = Middle; "N." = Northern; "S." = Southern; "W." = Western
  - e.g.,"C.C.S.D.N.Y." = United States Circuit Court for the Southern District of New York
  - e.g.,"M.D. Ala." = United States District Court for the Middle District of Alabama
- "Ct. Cl." = United States Court of Claims
- The abbreviation of a state's name alone indicates the highest appellate court in that state's judiciary at the time.
  - e.g.,"Pa." = Supreme Court of Pennsylvania
  - e.g.,"Me." = Supreme Judicial Court of Maine

== List of cases in 16 U.S. (3 Wheat.) ==
NOTE: Some decisions have alternate pagination, indicated by "{ }."

Case Name	Page and year	Opinion of the Court	Concurring opinion(s)	Dissenting opinion(s)	Lower Court	Disposition
Jackson ex rel. People v. Clarke	1 (1818)	Marshall	none	none	C.C.D.N.Y.	affirmed
The Friendschaft	14 {7} (1818)	Marshall	none	none	C.C.D.N.C.	affirmed
M'Iver v. Kyger	53 {24} (1818)	Marshall	none	none	C.C.D.C.	reversed
The Diana	58 {27} (1818)	per curiam	none	none	C.C.D.S.C.	affirmed
The New-York	59 {27} (1818)	Livingston	none	Johnson	C.C.S.D.N.Y.	affirmed
The Samuel	77 (1818)	Marshall	none	none	C.C.D.R.I.	reversed
The Star	78 {37} (1818)	Story	none	none	C.C.D.N.Y.	affirmed
The San Pedro	78 (1818)	Marshall	none	none	Super. Ct. Terr. Miss.	affirmed
Lanusse v. Barker	101 {48} (1818)	Johnson	none	none	C.C.D.N.Y.	reversed
Hughes v. Union Insurance Company	159 (1818)	Marshall	none	none	C.C.D. Md.	reversed
Swan v. Union Insurance Company	168 (1818)	Marshall	none	none	C.C.D. Md.	affirmed
Dugan v. United States	172 {82} (1818)	Livingston	none	none	C.C.D. Md.	affirmed
Olivera v. Union Insurance Company	183 (1818)	Marshall	none	none	C.C.D. Md.	reversed
Shepherd v. Hampton	200 {94} (1818)	Marshall	none	none	D. La.	affirmed
Patton v. Nicholson	204 {96} (1818)	Marshall	none	none	C.C.D.C.	affirmed
Robinson v. Campbell	212 {100} (1818)	Todd	none	none	E.D. Tenn.	affirmed
Dunlop v. Hepburn	231 (1818)	Washington	none	none	C.C.D.C.	affirmed
United States v. 150 Crates of Earthen-Ware	232 {110} (1818)	Marshall	none	none	D. La.	affirmed
Hampton v. M'Connel	234 (1818)	Marshall	none	none	C.C.D.S.C.	affirmed
The Fortuna	236 {112} (1818)	Johnson	none	none	C.C.D.N.C.	affirmed
Gelston v. Hoyt	246 {116} (1818)	Story	Johnson, Marshall	none	N.Y.	affirmed
United States v. Bevans	336 {157} (1818)	Marshall	none	none	C.C.D. Mass.	certification
The Æolus	392 (1818)	Livingston	none	Johnson	C.C.D. Mass.	affirmed
The Atalanta	409 (1818)	Marshall	none	none	C.C.D. Ga.	certification
Houston v. Moore	433 (1818)	Marshall	none	none	Pa.	dismissed
The Anne	435 {201} (1818)	Story	none	none	C.C.D. Md.	affirmed
Brown v. Jackson	449 (1818)	Todd	none	none	C.C.D. Ky.	affirmed
Evans v. Eaton	454 {210} (1818)	Marshall	none	none	C.C.E.D. Pa.	reversed
Lenox v. Prout	520 {240} (1818)	Livingston	none	none	C.C.D.C.	reversed
Burton's Lessee v. Williams	529 (1818)	Johnson	none	none	C.C.D.E. Tenn.	affirmed
Murray's Lessee v. Baker	541 (1818)	Johnson	none	none	C.C.D. Ga.	certification
The Amiable Nancy	546 {252} (1818)	Story	none	none	C.C.S.D.N.Y.	decree reformed
Craig v. Leslie	563 {260} (1818)	Washington	none	none	C.C.D. Va.	certification
Cameron v. M'Roberts	591 {272} (1818)	per curiam	none	none	C.C.D. Ky.	certification
Craig v. Radford	594 {274} (1818)	Washington	none	none	C.C.D. Ky.	affirmed
Ross v. Triplett	600 {276} (1818)	per curiam	none	none	C.C.D.C.	certification
The Neptune	601 {277} (1818)	Duvall	none	none	D. La.	affirmed
United States v. Palmer	610 {281} (1818)	Marshall	Johnson	none	C.C.D. Mass.	certification

== See also ==
- certificate of division
