= List of United States Supreme Court cases, volume 6 =

Supreme Court of the United States
- Interactive map of Supreme Court of the United States
- 38°53′26″N 77°00′16″W
- Established: March 4, 1789; 237 years ago
- Location: Washington, D.C.
- Coordinates: 38°53′26″N 77°00′16″W
- Composition method: Presidential nomination with Senate confirmation
- Authorised by: Constitution of the United States, Art. III, § 1
- Judge term length: life tenure, subject to impeachment and removal
- Number of positions: 9 (by statute)
- Website: supremecourt.gov

This is a list of cases reported in volume 6 (2 Cranch) of United States Reports, decided by the Supreme Court of the United States in 1804 and 1805.

== Nominative reports ==
In 1874, the U.S. government created the United States Reports, and retroactively numbered older privately published case reports as part of the new series. As a result, cases appearing in volumes 1–90 of U.S. Reports have dual citation forms; one for the volume number of U.S. Reports, and one for the volume number of the reports named for the relevant reporter of decisions (these are called "nominative reports").

=== William Cranch ===
Starting with the 5th volume of U.S. Reports, the Reporter of Decisions of the Supreme Court of the United States was William Cranch. Cranch was Reporter of Decisions from 1801 to 1815, covering volumes 5 through 13 of United States Reports which correspond to volumes 1 through 9 of his Cranch's Reports. As such, the complete citation to, for example, Wood v. Wagnon is 6 U.S. (2 Cranch) 10 (1804).

== Justices of the Supreme Court at the time of 6 U.S. (2 Cranch) ==
The Supreme Court is established by Article III, Section 1 of the Constitution of the United States, which says: "The judicial Power of the United States, shall be vested in one supreme Court . . .". The size of the Court is not specified; the Constitution leaves it to Congress to set the number of justices. Under the Judiciary Act of 1789 Congress originally fixed the number of justices at six (one chief justice and five associate justices). Since 1789 Congress has varied the size of the Court from six to seven, nine, ten, and back to nine justices (always including one chief justice).

When the cases in 6 U.S. (2 Cranch) were decided, the Court comprised these six justices:

Portrait	Justice	Office	Home State	Succeeded	Date confirmed by the Senate (Vote)	Tenure on Supreme Court
	John Marshall	Chief Justice	Virginia	Oliver Ellsworth	January 27, 1801 (Acclamation)	February 4, 1801 – July 6, 1835 (Died)
	William Cushing	Associate Justice	Massachusetts	original seat established	September 26, 1789 (Acclamation)	February 2, 1790 – September 13, 1810 (Died)
	William Paterson	Associate Justice	New Jersey	Thomas Johnson	March 4, 1793 (Acclamation)	March 11, 1793 – September 8, 1806 (Died)
	Samuel Chase	Associate Justice	Maryland	John Blair, Jr.	January 27, 1796 (Acclamation)	February 4, 1796 – June 19, 1811 (Died)
	Bushrod Washington	Associate Justice	Virginia	James Wilson	December 20, 1798 (Acclamation)	November 9, 1798 (Recess Appointment) – November 26, 1829 (Died)
	William Johnson	Associate Justice	South Carolina	Alfred Moore	March 24, 1804 (Acclamation)	May 7, 1804 – August 4, 1834 (Died)

== Notable cases in 6 U.S. (2 Cranch) ==
=== Little v. Barreme ===
In Little v. Barreme, 6 U.S. (2 Cranch) 170 (1804), the Supreme Court held that the President of the United States does not have "inherent authority" or "inherent powers" to ignore a law passed by the US Congress.

== Citation style ==
Under the Judiciary Act of 1789 the federal court structure at the time comprised District Courts, which had general trial jurisdiction; Circuit Courts, which had mixed trial and appellate (from the US District Courts) jurisdiction; and the United States Supreme Court, which had appellate jurisdiction over the federal District and Circuit courts—and for certain issues over state courts. The Supreme Court also had limited original jurisdiction (i.e., in which cases could be filed directly with the Supreme Court without first having been heard by a lower federal or state court). There were one or more federal District Courts and/or Circuit Courts in each state, territory, or other geographical region.

Bluebook citation style is used for case names, citations, and jurisdictions.

- "C.C.D." = United States Circuit Court for the District of . . .
  - e.g.,"C.C.D.N.J." = United States Circuit Court for the District of New Jersey
- "D." = United States District Court for the District of . . .
  - e.g.,"D. Mass." = United States District Court for the District of Massachusetts
- "E." = Eastern; "M." = Middle; "N." = Northern; "S." = Southern; "W." = Western
  - e.g.,"C.C.S.D.N.Y." = United States Circuit Court for the Southern District of New York
  - e.g.,"M.D. Ala." = United States District Court for the Middle District of Alabama
- "Ct. Cl." = United States Court of Claims
- The abbreviation of a state's name alone indicates the highest appellate court in that state's judiciary at the time.
  - e.g.,"Pa." = Supreme Court of Pennsylvania
  - e.g.,"Me." = Supreme Judicial Court of Maine

== List of cases in 6 U.S. (2 Cranch) ==
NOTE: Some decisions have alternate pagination, indicated by "{ }."

Case Name	Page & year	Opinion of the Court	Concurring opinion(s)	Dissenting opinion(s)	Lower court	Disposition
Williams v. Lyles	10 {9} (1804)	per curiam	none	none	C.C.D.C.	affirmed
Wood v. Wagnon	10 {9} (1804)	per curiam	none	none	C.C.D. Ga.	reversed
Faw v. Marsteller	10 (1804)	Marshall	none	none	C.C.D.C.	reversed
Ogle v. Lee	32 {33} (1804)	per curiam	none	none	not indicated	certification
Pennington v. Coxe	33 (1804)	Marshall	none	none	C.C.D. Pa.	reversed
The Schooner Charming Betsy	64 (1804)	Marshall	none	none	C.C.D. Pa.	reversed
Capron v. Van Noorden	126 (1804)	per curiam	none	none	C.C.D.N.C.	reversed
Head v. Providence Insurance Company	127 (1804)	Marshall	Chase	none	C.C.D.R.I.	reversed
Little v. Barreme	170 (1804)	Marshall	none	none	C.C.D. Mass.	affirmed
Dunlop and Company v. Ball	180 (1804)	Marshall	none	none	C.C.D.C.	reversed
Blakeney v. Evans	186 {185} (1804)	per curiam	none	none	C.C.D.C.	affirmed
Church v. Hubbart	187 (1804)	Cushing	none	none	C.C.D. Mass.	reversed
The Ship Blaireau	240 (1804)	Marshall	none	none	C.C.D. Md.	affirmed
Ogden v. Blackledge	272 (1804)	Cushing	none	none	C.C.D.N.C.	certification
McIlvaine v. Coxe's Lessee	280 (1805)	per curiam	none	none	C.C.D.N.J.	no decision in this report
Adams v. Woods	336 (1805)	Marshall	none	none	C.C.D. Mass.	certification
Winchester v. Hackley	342 (1805)	per curiam	none	none	C.C.D. Va.	affirmed
Reily v. Lamar	344 (1805)	Marshall	none	none	C.C.D.C.	dismissed
United States v. Fisher	358 (1805)	Marshall	none	none	C.C.D. Pa.	reversed
Bailiff v. Tipping	406 (1805)	per curiam	none	none	C.C.D. Ky.	dismissed
The Schooner Sally	406 (1805)	per curiam	none	none	C.C.D. Md.	affirmed
Telfair v. Stead's Executors	407 (1805)	Marshall	none	none	C.C.D. Ga.	affirmed
Graves v. Boston Marine Insurance Company	419 (1805)	Marshall	none	none	C.C.D. Mass.	affirmed
Hepburn v. Ellzey	445 (1805)	Marshall	none	none	C.C.D. Va.	certification

== See also ==
- certificate of division
