= Craig v. Radford =

Craig et al. v. Radford
- Supreme Court of the United States

Decided March 12, 1818
- Full case name: Craig et al. v. Radford
- Citations: 16 U.S. 594 (more) 3 Wheat. 594, 4 L. Ed. 467

Holding
- Decree affirmed with costs

Court membership
- Chief Justice John Marshall Associate Justices Bushrod Washington · William Johnson; H. Brockholst Livingston · Thomas Todd; Gabriel Duvall · Joseph Story

Case opinion
- Majority: Washington, joined by unanimous

Craig et al. v. Radford, 16 U.S. (3 Wheat.) 594 (1818), is a United States Supreme Court decision delivered by Justice Bushrod Washington on March 12, 1818. The dispute arose from a suit in chancery to establish a clear title to land in Kentucky located on the south bank of the Ohio River, 30 miles downriver from the mouth of the Scioto River. A military land warrant for 1,000 acres had been issued by the Colony of Virginia on January 24, 1774, and duly patented by a French and Indian War veteran, William Sutherland. Subsequently, treasury warrants were purchased from the Commonwealth of Virginia in 1780 by Craig et al. which they duly patented over parts of the same property. A suit in the United States Circuit Court for the District of Kentucky awarded unconditional title to the original Sutherland patent. An appeal was argued before the Supreme Court during the 1817 term but the verdict upheld the lower court's decision. Non-citizen property rights established by this case have been cited and argued ever since.

Early owners of the property included William Clark, Admiral William Radford and General Stephen W. Kearny.

== Origin of the Dispute ==
The Treaty of Paris in 1763 concluded the French and Indian War and distributed the lands of New France between Britain and Spain. King George then issued a royal proclamation. In it, he instructed his Royal Governors to issue military land warrants to war veterans, awarding acreage based upon military rank. Also, in recognition that the Cherokee from the south and the many Indian tribes north of the Ohio River hunted but did not reside in the area they called Kentucky, the king declared an Indian Reserve west of the Appalachian Divide by invalidating any land claims and ordering all settlers to vacate the reserve area.

The allure of uninhabited land, especially the Bluegrass Region, contributed to the colonist's disregard for the Indian Reserve. Settlers already in-place believed they had established "cabin rights". Newcomers, by building a cabin and farming the land, felt qualified under the homestead principle. As a result, the 1763 boundary line continually crept westward as British agents negotiated new treaties, such as the Treaty of Fort Stanwix, Treaty of Hard Labour and Treaty of Lochaber. Individuals also purchased land directly from tribes, such as for the Transylvania Colony. These transactions involved either the Cherokee or tribes from Pennsylvania, but they mostly ignored the western tribes north of the Ohio River, such as the Shawnee and Miami. The growing influx of settlers gave rise to deadly conflicts due to this oversight.

In 1772, the last Royal Governor for the Colony of Virginia, John Murray, 4th Earl of Dunmore (also known as Lord Dunmore) established Fincastle County, extending to the Mississippi River, the border with Spanish Louisiana. He named William Preston as principal surveyor for the county. In 1773, Lord Dunmore issued the overdue military land warrants to French and Indian War veterans and their scope encompassed land south of the Ohio River, between the Scioto River and the Falls of the Ohio. In April 1774, teams departed to survey thousands of acres over the next months. On May 4, 1774, surveyor Hancock Taylor (along with chainmen Abraham Hemptonstrall, James Strother and Willis Lee) conducted a 1,000 acre survey for William Sutherland, who had served as an Ensign for the 95th Regiment of Foot. On July 27, 1774, close to present-day Carrollton, Indians attacked the survey party, killing Strother and wounding Taylor. During the party's retreat home, Taylor died near Richmond. Hemptonstrall and Lee delivered Taylor's field notes to Preston's residence Smithfield. Preston recorded all of Taylor's surveys.

The Virginia legislature abolished Fincastle County on December 31, 1774, due to its affiliation with loyalist Lord Dunmore. The Sutherland property then came under the jurisdiction of Kentucky County, Virginia. Upon the commencement of the American Revolutionary War, loyalist Sutherland permanently left Virginia for Orkney but still continued ownership of his Kentucky land.

John Craig, Lewis Craig and Simon Kenton purchased treasury warrants in 1780 and redeemed them for acreage which overlaid the Sutherland tract. Their claims were surveyed during 1785 and land patents were issued on or prior to May 26, 1788. The Commonwealth of Virginia did not patent the 1,000 acres to Sutherland until August 5, 1788. Kentucky County was abolished on June 30, 1780, when it was divided into Fayette, Jefferson, and Lincoln Virginia counties. These three counties were retained when the Commonwealth of Kentucky was created in 1792. The disputed property came under jurisdiction of Fayette County, Kentucky.

Beginning August 19, 1796, William Sutherland began periodically advertising sale of his land, then under Mason County jurisdiction, through the Kentucky Court of Appeals. On February 13, 1799, Speculator William Radford (Admiral William Radford was his grandson) purchased Sutherland's 1,000 acre deed for $3,000. Radford, finding individuals who refused to relinquish their claims to his land, began a suit December 2, 1800 in chancery in United States District Court for the Eastern District of Kentucky. Following William Radford's death in 1803, his heir John Radford continued the suit. The court records announcing the final verdict are apparently lost; the last entry was dated November 24, 1806 while the case was still ongoing. In 1808, John, with his wife Harriet and infant son William, relocated from Fincastle, Virginia to the disputed property finally situated in Lewis County, Kentucky.

== Objections ==
Most of the background was admitted as fact by both parties in the suit. Craig et al. disputed the following:

1. Deputy surveyor Taylor did not hold the land warrant and so had no authority to execute his survey.
2. There was no physical proof of Taylor's survey and, even if so, Hemptonstrall testified the survey was begun but not completed.
3. Incomplete lines run by a deputy should not be sufficient for the principal surveyor to certify the plat and validate the grant.
4. Sutherland, as a Tory, was an enemy alien and forfeited his colonial land warrant when Virginia joined the United States.

== Resolution ==
The Supreme Court overruled all four objections. There was no dissenting opinion identified in the resolution.

1. The principal surveyor's certificate referencing the land warrant is sufficient authority for the survey.
2. Incompetent or incomplete surveys do not invalidate the claim to the land.
3. A deputy has the whole power of the principal surveyor and Taylor's survey was accepted by the principal as completed.
4. No act of Virginia legislation had divested property from enemy alien owners before 1794 and the Jay Treaty ninth article protected defeasible estate from then on.

== Basis ==
Traditional English law allowed aliens to purchase land but the crown retained interest to that land. So, even though an alien could exercise dominion over his property as a tenant, he could not bequeath the land to heirs and had to surrender the title upon demand from the crown. Upon declaration of war, enemy aliens automatically forfeited their title to the land. That presumption from long standing law became a pleading for this case.

However, the Supreme Court held that land owned by British subjects, made aliens due to the Revolutionary War, was protected from confiscation per the Treaty of Paris. To reclaim land possessed by British subjects, each state had to pass applicable legislation and then complete escheat proceedings for individual cases. Virginia did not enact such law. As of 1794, under the protection afforded by the Jay Treaty, British subject Sutherland retained title to his 1,000 acres in question.

== Sidebar ==
John Radford died, gored by a boar in a hunting accident in 1817, before the Supreme Court decision was delivered the following year. Widow Harriet Kennerly Radford moved with her three children to Saint Louis, Missouri to live near her two brothers, James and George Kennerly, and ailing first cousin, Julia Hancock Clark. Julia's husband was William Clark. Julia passed in 1820 and Harriet became Clark's second wife in 1821.

William Preston wrote a letter May 27, 1774 to George Washington describing the escalated attacks his surveyors and residents in Kentucky were facing. These deadly attacks were a prelude to Lord Dunmore's War and then the subsequent Illinois Campaign and Northwest Indian War.

There is argument that this case, by extending rights to non-citizen individuals per federal treaties, exceeded United States Constitutional authority. New York lawyer Franklin Pierce contended in 1908 that land titles were domestic law and state statutes were wrongly overridden, specifying this case as an example. In 1984, Judge Robert Bork wrote a concurring opinion for the Tel-Oren v. Libyan Arab Republican case in the United States Court of Appeals for the District of Columbia Circuit which argued the courts cannot apply treaty rights without explicit private right of action specified in the treaty.
