= Little v. Barreme =

- Supreme Court of the United States

Argued December 16, 19, 1801 Decided February 27, 1804
- Full case name: George Little, et al. v. Barreme, et al.
- Citations: 6 U.S. 170 (more) 2 Cranch 170; 2 L. Ed. 243; 1804 U.S. LEXIS 255

Court membership
- Chief Justice John Marshall Associate Justices William Cushing · William Paterson; Samuel Chase · Bushrod Washington

Case opinion
- Majority: Marshall, joined by unanimous

Laws applied
- U.S. Const.

Little v. Barreme, 6 U.S. (2 Cranch) 170 (1804), was a United States Supreme Court case in which the Court found that the President of the United States does not have "inherent authority" or "inherent powers", either as commander in chief or under the Faithful Execution Clause, to modify a procedure that Congress has provided, even if the executive action was compatible with the legislative intent.

== Summary ==
A Presidential executive order was invalidated because the President was operating outside of his express Congressional authority.

== Facts ==
The case derived from "an interesting and revealing incident" that occurred during the "Quasi War" with France at the end of the 18th century. The frigate USS Boston commanded by captain George Little captured a Danish vessel, the Flying Fish, by order of the Secretary of the Navy on behalf of President John Adams "to intercept any suspected American ship sailing to or from a French port." The Congress, however, had passed a law authorizing the navy to seize "vessels or cargoes [that] are apparently, as well as really, American" and "bound or sailing to any [French] port" in an attempt to prevent American vessels transporting goods to France. The Flying Fish was sailing from and not to a French port. Captain Little was declared to be liable for executing a command that was illegal. Little appealed to the Supreme Court, where the decision was upheld. Chief Justice John Marshall wrote "Is the officer who obeys [the President's order] liable for damages sustained by this misconstruction of the act, or will his orders excuse him? ... the instructions cannot change the nature of the transaction, or legalize an act which without those instructions would have been a plain trespass."

== Procedural history ==
1. District Court, found for Petitioner
2. Circuit Court of Massachusetts, reversed, found for Respondent
3. United States Supreme Court, affirmed, found for Respondent

== Issues ==
1. Whether an order of the President, which in effect attempts to make law, can override an act of Congress.
2. Officers are responsible for execution of illegal commands, despite nature of military chain of command.

== Holding ==
No, an order of the President which is in contradiction with an act of Congress is illegal.

=== Reasoning ===
The legislative branch makes laws and the executive branch enforces the laws. The Act of Congress provided only for the capture of vessels traveling to France. "The Flying Fish was on a voyage from, not to, a French port, and was, therefore, had she even been an American vessel, not liable to be captured on the high seas." The Act limited the president's authority by only allowing the capture of certain vessels. The President acted contrary to these limitations.

== See also ==
- List of United States Supreme Court cases, volume 6
- United States v. Curtiss-Wright Export Corp.
