= List of United States Supreme Court cases, volume 26 =

Supreme Court of the United States
- Interactive map of Supreme Court of the United States
- 38°53′26″N 77°00′16″W
- Established: March 4, 1789; 237 years ago
- Location: Washington, D.C.
- Coordinates: 38°53′26″N 77°00′16″W
- Composition method: Presidential nomination with Senate confirmation
- Authorised by: Constitution of the United States, Art. III, § 1
- Judge term length: life tenure, subject to impeachment and removal
- Number of positions: 9 (by statute)
- Website: supremecourt.gov

This is a list of cases reported in volume 26 (1 Pet.) of United States Reports, decided by the Supreme Court of the United States in 1828.

== Nominative reports ==
In 1874, the U.S. government created the United States Reports, and retroactively numbered older privately published case reports as part of the new series. As a result, cases appearing in volumes 1–90 of U.S. Reports have dual citation forms; one for the volume number of U.S. Reports, and one for the volume number of the reports named for the relevant reporter of decisions (these are called "nominative reports").

=== Richard Peters, Jr. ===
Starting with the 26th volume of U.S. Reports, the Reporter of Decisions of the Supreme Court of the United States was Richard Peters Jr. Peters was Reporter of Decisions from 1828 to 1843, covering volumes 26 through 41 of United States Reports which correspond to volumes 1 through 16 of his Peters's Reports. As such, the dual form of citation to, for example, United States v. Stansbury is 26 U.S. (1 Pet.) 573 (1828).

== Justices of the Supreme Court at the time of 26 U.S. (1 Pet.) ==
The Supreme Court is established by Article III, Section 1 of the Constitution of the United States, which says: "The judicial Power of the United States, shall be vested in one supreme Court . . .". The size of the Court is not specified; the Constitution leaves it to Congress to set the number of justices. Under the Judiciary Act of 1789 Congress originally fixed the number of justices at six (one chief justice and five associate justices). Since 1789 Congress has varied the size of the Court from six to seven, nine, ten, and back to nine justices (always including one chief justice).

When the cases in 26 U.S. (1 Pet.) were decided, the Court comprised these seven justices:

Portrait	Justice	Office	Home State	Succeeded	Date confirmed by the Senate (Vote)	Tenure on Supreme Court
	John Marshall	Chief Justice	Virginia	Oliver Ellsworth	January 27, 1801 (Acclamation)	February 4, 1801 – July 6, 1835 (Died)
	Bushrod Washington	Associate Justice	Virginia	James Wilson	December 20, 1798 (Acclamation)	November 9, 1798 (Recess Appointment) – November 26, 1829 (Died)
	William Johnson	Associate Justice	South Carolina	Alfred Moore	March 24, 1804 (Acclamation)	May 7, 1804 – August 4, 1834 (Died)
	Gabriel Duvall	Associate Justice	Maryland	Samuel Chase	November 18, 1811 (Acclamation)	November 23, 1811 – January 12, 1835 (Resigned)
	Joseph Story	Associate Justice	Massachusetts	William Cushing	November 18, 1811 (Acclamation)	February 3, 1812 – September 10, 1845 (Died)
	Smith Thompson	Associate Justice	New York	Henry Brockholst Livingston	December 9, 1823 (Acclamation)	September 1, 1823 – December 18, 1843 (Died)
	Robert Trimble	Associate Justice	Kentucky	Thomas Todd	May 9, 1826 (25–5)	June 16, 1826 – August 25, 1828 (Died)

== Citation style ==
Under the Judiciary Act of 1789 the federal court structure at the time comprised District Courts, which had general trial jurisdiction; Circuit Courts, which had mixed trial and appellate (from the US District Courts) jurisdiction; and the United States Supreme Court, which had appellate jurisdiction over the federal District and Circuit courts—and for certain issues over state courts. The Supreme Court also had limited original jurisdiction (i.e., in which cases could be filed directly with the Supreme Court without first having been heard by a lower federal or state court). There were one or more federal District Courts and/or Circuit Courts in each state, territory, or other geographical region.

Bluebook citation style is used for case names, citations, and jurisdictions.

- "C.C.D." = United States Circuit Court for the District of . . .
  - e.g.,"C.C.D.N.J." = United States Circuit Court for the District of New Jersey
- "D." = United States District Court for the District of . . .
  - e.g.,"D. Mass." = United States District Court for the District of Massachusetts
- "E." = Eastern; "M." = Middle; "N." = Northern; "S." = Southern; "W." = Western
  - e.g.,"C.C.S.D.N.Y." = United States Circuit Court for the Southern District of New York
  - e.g.,"M.D. Ala." = United States District Court for the Middle District of Alabama
- "Ct. Cl." = United States Court of Claims
- The abbreviation of a state's name alone indicates the highest appellate court in that state's judiciary at the time.
  - e.g.,"Pa." = Supreme Court of Pennsylvania
  - e.g.,"Me." = Supreme Judicial Court of Maine

== List of cases in 26 U.S. (1 Pet.) ==
Case Name	Page and year	Opinion of the Court	Concurring opinion(s)	Dissenting opinion(s)	Lower Court	Disposition
Hunt v. Rhodes	1 (1828)	Washington	none	none	C.C.D.R.I.	affirmed
Carroll v. Peake	18 (1828)	Trimble	none	none	C.C.D.C.	affirmed
Bank of Washington v. Triplett	25 (1828)	Marshall	none	none	C.C.D.C.	reversed
Gaither v. Farmers' and Mechanics' Bank of Georgetown ex rel. Corcorran	37 (1828)	Johnson	none	none	not indicated	reversed
Minor v. Mechanics' Bank of Alexandria	46 (1828)	Story	none	none	C.C.D.C.	affirmed
Pearson v. Bank of the Metropolis	89 (1828)	Marshall	none	none	C.C.D.C.	affirmed
Hickie v. Starke	94 (1828)	Marshall	none	none	Miss.	dismissed
United States v. Saline Bank of Virginia	100 (1828)	Marshall	none	none	W.D. Va.	affirmed
Rhea v. Rhenner	105 (1828)	Duvall	none	none	C.C.D.C.	reversed
Georgia v. Madrazo	110 (1828)	Marshall	none	Johnson	C.C.D. Ga.	reversed
Mandeville v. Holey	136 (1828)	Marshall	none	none	C.C.D.C.	affirmed
Greenleaf v. Queen	138 (1828)	Washington	none	none	C.C.D.C.	reversed
Buck v. Chesapeake Insurance Company	151 (1828)	Johnson	none	none	C.C.D. Md.	certification
Wright v. Hollingsworth's Lessee	165 (1828)	Trimble	none	none	C.C.D.E. Tenn.	affirmed
McLanahan v. Universal Insurance Company	170 (1828)	Story	none	none	C.C.D. Md.	reversed
Comegys v. Vasse	193 (1828)	Story	none	none	C.C.D. Pa.	reversed
Karthaus v. Yllas y Ferrer	222 (1828)	Trimble	none	none	C.C.D. Md.	affirmed
Horsburg v. Baker	232 (1828)	Marshall	none	none	C.C.D. Ky.	reversed
Breithaupt v. Bank of Georgia	238 (1828)	per curiam	none	none	C.C.D. Ga.	certification
Findlay v. Hinde	241 (1828)	Trimble	none	none	C.C.D. Ohio	reversed
Old Grant v. M'Kee ex rel. Bank of Kentucky	248 (1828)	Marshall	none	none	C.C.D. Ky.	dismissed
Konig v. Bayard	250 (1828)	Marshall	none	none	C.C.S.D.N.Y.	certification
Schimmelpennich v. Bayard	264 (1828)	Marshall	none	none	C.C.S.D.N.Y.	certification
Parker v. United States	293 (1828)	Duvall	none	none	C.C.D.C.	affirmed
Mechanics' Bank of Alexandria v. Seton	299 (1828)	Thompson	none	none	C.C.D.C.	affirmed
Barry v. Foyles	311 (1828)	Marshall	none	none	C.C.D.C.	affirmed
Dox v. Postmaster General	318 (1828)	Marshall	none	none	C.C.S.D.N.Y.	certification
Ellott v. Peirsol's Lessee	328 (1828)	Trimble	none	none	C.C.D. Ky.	affirmed
Spratt's Lessee v. Spratt	343 (1828)	Marshall	none	none	C.C.D.C.	reversed
Bell v. Morrison	351 (1828)	Story	none	none	C.C.D. Ky.	affirmed
Mechanics' Bank of Alexandria v. Lynn	376 (1828)	Thompson	none	none	C.C.D.C.	reversed
Conard v. Atlantic Insurance Company of New York	386 (1828)	Story	Johnson	none	C.C.D. Pa.	affirmed
Bank of Columbia v. Hagner	455 (1828)	Thompson	none	none	C.C.D.C.	affirmed
Doe v. Grymes	469 (1828)	Marshall	none	Johnson	C.C.D. Ga.	dismissed
D'Wolf v. Jacques	476 (1828)	Story	none	none	C.C.S.D.N.Y.	affirmed
Davis v. Mason	503 (1828)	Johnson	none	none	C.C.D. Ky.	affirmed
American Insurance Company v. 356 Bales of Cotton	511 (1828)	Marshall	none	none	C.C.D.S.C.	affirmed
United States v. 422 Casks of Wine	547 (1828)	Story	none	none	D. La.	affirmed
Steele's Lessee v. Spencer	552 (1828)	Trimble	none	none	C.C.D. Ohio	reversed
Nicholls v. Hodges	562 (1828)	Duvall	none	none	C.C.D.C.	multiple
Bank of Columbia v. Sweeny	567 (1828)	Marshall	none	none	C.C.D.C.	dismissed
Waring v. Jackson	570 (1828)	Thompson	none	none	C.C.S.D.N.Y.	affirmed
United States v. Stansbury	573 (1828)	Marshall	none	none	C.C.D. Md.	reversed
Bank of Columbia ex rel. Second Bank of the United States v. Lawrence	578 (1828)	Thompson	none	none	C.C.D.C.	reversed
Archer v. Deneale	585 (1828)	Marshall	none	none	C.C.D.C.	affirmed
Tayloe v. Riggs	591 (1828)	Marshall	none	none	C.C.D.C.	reversed
Fullerton v. Second Bank of the United States	604 (1828)	Johnson	none	none	C.C.D. Ohio	affirmed
M'Donald v. Smalley	620 (1828)	Marshall	none	none	C.C.D. Ohio	reversed
McArthur v. Porter	626 (1828)	Marshall	none	none	C.C.D. Ohio	reversed
Jackson v. Clark	628 (1828)	Marshall	none	none	C.C.D. Ohio	affirmed
Barry v. Coombe	640 (1828)	Johnson	none	none	C.C.D.C.	affirmed
Ross v. Doe	655 (1828)	Trimble	none	none	Miss.	affirmed
Pray v. Belt	670 (1828)	Marshall	none	none	C.C.D. Ga.	reversed
Alexander v. Brown	683 (1828)	Marshall	none	none	C.C.D.C.	affirmed
Biddle v. Wilkins	686 (1828)	Thompson	none	none	D. Miss.	reversed

== See also ==
- certificate of division
