= List of United States Supreme Court cases, volume 32 =

Supreme Court of the United States
- Interactive map of Supreme Court of the United States
- 38°53′26″N 77°00′16″W
- Established: March 4, 1789; 237 years ago
- Location: Washington, D.C.
- Coordinates: 38°53′26″N 77°00′16″W
- Composition method: Presidential nomination with Senate confirmation
- Authorised by: Constitution of the United States, Art. III, § 1
- Judge term length: life tenure, subject to impeachment and removal
- Number of positions: 9 (by statute)
- Website: supremecourt.gov

This is a list of cases reported in volume 32 (7 Pet.) of United States Reports, decided by the Supreme Court of the United States in 1833.

== Nominative reports ==
In 1874, the U.S. government created the United States Reports, and retroactively numbered older privately published case reports as part of the new series. As a result, cases appearing in volumes 1–90 of U.S. Reports have dual citation forms; one for the volume number of U.S. Reports, and one for the volume number of the reports named for the relevant reporter of decisions (these are called "nominative reports").

=== Richard Peters, Jr. ===
Starting with the 26th volume of U.S. Reports, the Reporter of Decisions of the Supreme Court of the United States was Richard Peters Jr. Peters was Reporter of Decisions from 1828 to 1843, covering volumes 26 through 41 of United States Reports which correspond to volumes 1 through 16 of his Peters's Reports. As such, the dual form of citation to, for example, Livingston v. Moore is 32 U.S. (7 Pet.) 469 (1833).

== Justices of the Supreme Court at the time of 32 U.S. (7 Pet.) ==
The Supreme Court is established by Article III, Section 1 of the Constitution of the United States, which says: "The judicial Power of the United States, shall be vested in one supreme Court . . .". The size of the Court is not specified; the Constitution leaves it to Congress to set the number of justices. Under the Judiciary Act of 1789 Congress originally fixed the number of justices at six (one chief justice and five associate justices). Since 1789 Congress has varied the size of the Court from six to seven, nine, ten, and back to nine justices (always including one chief justice).

When the cases in 32 U.S. (7 Pet.) were decided, the Court comprised these seven justices:

Portrait	Justice	Office	Home State	Succeeded	Date confirmed by the Senate (Vote)	Tenure on Supreme Court
	John Marshall	Chief Justice	Virginia	Oliver Ellsworth	January 27, 1801 (Acclamation)	February 4, 1801 – July 6, 1835 (Died)
	William Johnson	Associate Justice	South Carolina	Alfred Moore	March 24, 1804 (Acclamation)	May 7, 1804 – August 4, 1834 (Died)
	Gabriel Duvall	Associate Justice	Maryland	Samuel Chase	November 18, 1811 (Acclamation)	November 23, 1811 – January 12, 1835 (Resigned)
	Joseph Story	Associate Justice	Massachusetts	William Cushing	November 18, 1811 (Acclamation)	February 3, 1812 – September 10, 1845 (Died)
	Smith Thompson	Associate Justice	New York	Henry Brockholst Livingston	December 9, 1823 (Acclamation)	September 1, 1823 – December 18, 1843 (Died)
	John McLean	Associate Justice	Ohio	Robert Trimble	March 7, 1829 (Acclamation)	January 11, 1830 – April 4, 1861 (Died)
	Henry Baldwin	Associate Justice	Pennsylvania	Bushrod Washington	January 6, 1830 (41–2)	January 18, 1830 – April 21, 1844 (Died)

== Notable Cases in 32 U.S. (7 Pet.) ==
=== Barron v. Baltimore ===
Barron v. Baltimore, 32 U.S. (7 Pet.) 243 (1833), is a landmark United States Supreme Court case which helped define the concept of federalism in US constitutional law. The Supreme Court ruled that the Bill of Rights applied only to the United States government, and not to the state governments. Over time, in the later 19th and into the 20th Centuries, however, the Court incorporated parts of the Bill of Rights to apply to state governments.

== Citation style ==
Under the Judiciary Act of 1789 the federal court structure at the time comprised District Courts, which had general trial jurisdiction; Circuit Courts, which had mixed trial and appellate (from the US District Courts) jurisdiction; and the United States Supreme Court, which had appellate jurisdiction over the federal District and Circuit courts—and for certain issues over state courts. The Supreme Court also had limited original jurisdiction (i.e., in which cases could be filed directly with the Supreme Court without first having been heard by a lower federal or state court). There were one or more federal District Courts and/or Circuit Courts in each state, territory, or other geographical region.

Bluebook citation style is used for case names, citations, and jurisdictions.

- "C.C.D." = United States Circuit Court for the District of . . .
  - e.g.,"C.C.D.N.J." = United States Circuit Court for the District of New Jersey
- "D." = United States District Court for the District of . . .
  - e.g.,"D. Mass." = United States District Court for the District of Massachusetts
- "E." = Eastern; "M." = Middle; "N." = Northern; "S." = Southern; "W." = Western
  - e.g.,"C.C.S.D.N.Y." = United States Circuit Court for the Southern District of New York
  - e.g.,"M.D. Ala." = United States District Court for the Middle District of Alabama
- "Ct. Cl." = United States Court of Claims
- The abbreviation of a state's name alone indicates the highest appellate court in that state's judiciary at the time.
  - e.g.,"Pa." = Supreme Court of Pennsylvania
  - e.g.,"Me." = Supreme Judicial Court of Maine

== List of cases in 32 U.S. (7 Pet.) ==
Case Name	Page & year	Opinion of the Court	Concurring opinion(s)	Dissenting opinion(s)	Lower Court	Disposition
United States v. MacDaniel	1 (1833)	McLean	none	none	C.C.D.C.	affirmed
United States v. Ripley	18 (1833)	McLean	none	none	E.D. La.	reversed
United States v. Fillebrown	28 (1833)	Thompson	none	none	C.C.D.C.	affirmed
United States v. Percheman	51 (1833)	Marshall	none	none	Fla. Super. Ct.	affirmed
Minor v. Tillotson	99 (1833)	Thompson	none	none	E.D. La.	reversed
Nichols v. Fearson	103 (1833)	Johnson	none	none	C.C.D.C.	reversed
Douglass v. Reynolds, Byrne & Co.	113 (1833)	Story	none	none	D. Miss.	reversed
Estho v. Lear	130 (1833)	Marshall	none	none	C.C.D.C.	reversed
United States v. Turner	132 (1833)	Story	none	none	C.C.D.N.C.	certification
United States v. Mills	138 (1833)	Thompson	none	none	C.C.D.N.C.	certification
Pickett's Heirs v. Legerwood	144 (1833)	Johnson	none	none	C.C.D. Ky.	dismissed
United States v. Wilson	150 (1833)	Marshall	none	none	C.C.E.D. Pa.	certification
United States v. Brewster	164 (1833)	per curiam	none	none	C.C.E.D. Pa.	certification
Farmers' Bank v. Hooff	168 (1833)	Marshall	none	none	C.C.D.C.	dismissed
Holmes v. Trout	171 (1833)	McLean	none	none	C.C.D. Ky.	affirmed
Yeaton v. Lenox	220 (1833)	Marshall	none	none	C.C.D.C.	dismissed
Sampeyreac v. United States	222 (1833)	Marshall	none	none	Super. Ct. Terr. Ark.	affirmed
Barron ex rel. Tiernan v. City of Baltimore	243 (1833)	Thompson	none	none	Md.	dismissed
Vattier v. Hinde	252 (1833)	Marshall	none	none	C.C.D. Ohio	reversed
Davis v. Packard	276 (1833)	Thompson	none	none	N.Y.	reversed
Union Bank v. Magruder	287 (1833)	Story	none	none	C.C.D.C.	affirmed
Shaw v. Cooper	292 (1833)	McLean	none	none	C.C.S.D.N.Y.	affirmed
Peyroux v. Howard	324 (1833)	Thompson	none	none	E.D. La.	multiple
Magniac v. Thomson	348 (1833)	Story	none	none	C.C.E.D. Pa.	affirmed
Owings v. Kincannon	399 (1833)	Marshall	none	none	C.C.D. Ky.	dismissed
Barlow v. United States	404 (1833)	Story	none	none	C.C.S.D.N.Y.	affirmed
Breedlove v. Nicolet	413 (1833)	Marshall	none	none	E.D. La.	affirmed
Duncan's Heirs v. United States	435 (1833)	McLean	none	none	E.D. La.	affirmed
United States v. 84 Boxes of Sugar	453 (1833)	McLean	none	none	E.D. La.	mandamus granted
Tyrell's Heirs v. Rountree	464 (1833)	Marshall	none	none	C.C.D.W. Tenn.	affirmed
Livingston v. Moore	469 (1833)	Johnson	none	none	C.C.E.D. Pa.	affirmed
Morris v. Harmer's Lessee	554 (1833)	Story	none	none	C.C.D. Ohio	affirmed
Ex parte Watkins	568 (1833)	Story	none	Johnson, McLean	C.C.D.C.	habeas corpus granted
Scholefield v. Eichelberger	586 (1833)	Johnson	none	none	C.C.D. Md.	affirmed
Scott v. Lunt's Adm'r	596 (1833)	Story	none	none	C.C.D.C.	reversed
Brashear v. West	608 (1833)	Marshall	none	none	C.C.D. Ky.	reversed
St. Colombe's Heirs v. United States	625 (1833)	Marshall	none	none	E.D. La.	reversed
Ex parte Madrazzo	627 (1833)	Marshall	none	none	C.C.D. Ga.	dismissed
Ward v. Gregory	633 (1833)	per curiam	none	none	Ct. App. Fla. Terr.	dismissed
Ex parte Bradstreet	634 (1833)	Marshall	none	none	N.D.N.Y.	mandamus granted
Rhode Island v. Massachusetts	651 (1833)	per curiam	none	none	original	subpoena issued

== See also ==
- certificate of division
