= John Clark (Georgia politician) =

American politician

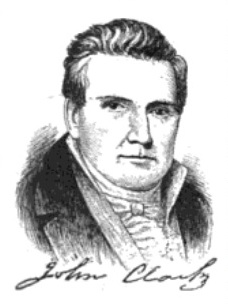

31st Governor of Georgia
- In office November 5, 1819 – November 7, 1823
- Preceded by: Matthew Talbot
- Succeeded by: George Troup

Personal details
- Born: February 28, 1766 Edgecombe County, North Carolina
- Died: October 12, 1832 (aged 66) St. Andrews Bay, Florida, US
- Resting place: St. Andrews Bay, relocated to Marietta National Cemetery
- Party: Democratic-Republican
- Spouse: Nancy Clark
- Relatives: Elijah Clarke (father), Edward Clark (nephew)
- Occupation: Planter, politician

John Clark (sometimes spelled Clarke) (February 28, 1766 – October 12, 1832) was an American planter, politician, and slaveholder. He was the 31st governor of the U.S. state of Georgia, from 1819 to 1823. As governor, he prevailed in the U.S. Supreme Court case Ex parte Madrazzo, a dispute over whether a claim of ownership of a group of enslaved people could be enforced against the state. He also advocated for presidential electors to be elected by popular vote as seen in many of his bills, culminating in the 1824 Georgia Popular Vote Referendum.

== Early life ==
Clark was born in 1766 in Edgecombe County, North Carolina. Along with his father, Elijah Clarke, Clark fought in the American Revolutionary War at the Battle of Kettle Creek and served in the Georgia militia.

He moved to Wilkes County, Georgia, in the early 1770s. He became a major general in 1796.

== Political career ==
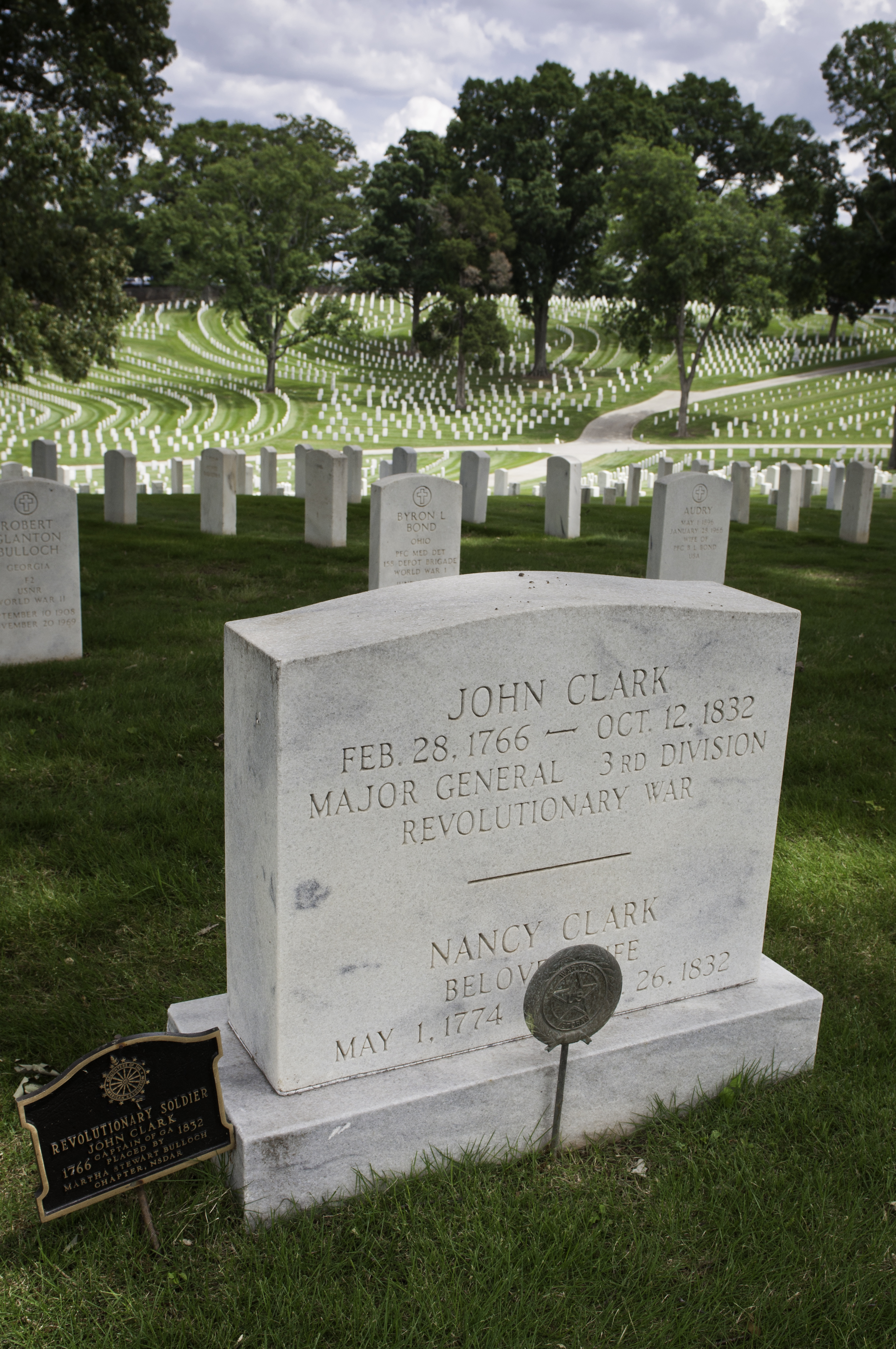
John Clark's gravestone at the Marietta National Cemetery, Marietta, Georgia

Clark served as a presidential elector in the 1816 presidential election. He served in the Georgia House of Representatives before he was elected to consecutive two-year terms as the 31st governor, from 1819 to 1823. During his term, he successfully defended states' rights in a US Supreme Court case, Ex parte Madrazzo, over a Spanish citizen who claimed that he owned some of Clark's slaves.

== Personal life ==
Clark resided at Woodville, a plantation in Milledgeville, Georgia. He was married to Nancy Williamson, the daughter of Col. Micahah Williamson (1744-1796) and Sarah Gilliam.

== Death and legacy ==
Clark died of yellow fever in St. Andrews Bay, Florida, in 1832, in what was then Washington County (now Bay County) and was buried in that same city; however, his grave was relocated to Marietta National Cemetery in Georgia in 1923 by the Georgia State Society Daughters of the American Revolution.

Clarkesville, Georgia and Clarke County, Alabama are named after him.

== Sources ==
- "John Clark (1766–1832)," New Georgia Encyclopedia.
- Georgia State Archives Roster of State Governors
- Georgia Governor's Gravesites Field Guide (1776–2003)
- Georgia Secretary of State official website
- John Clark House historical marker
- G.M. West 1922
- https://services.dar.org/members/DAR_Research/search_adb/default.cfm

Political offices
| Preceded by Matthew Talbot | Governor of Georgia; 1819–1823 | Succeeded by George Troup |
