= List of United States Supreme Court cases, volume 21 =

Supreme Court of the United States
- Interactive map of Supreme Court of the United States
- 38°53′26″N 77°00′16″W
- Established: March 4, 1789; 237 years ago
- Location: Washington, D.C.
- Coordinates: 38°53′26″N 77°00′16″W
- Composition method: Presidential nomination with Senate confirmation
- Authorised by: Constitution of the United States, Art. III, § 1
- Judge term length: life tenure, subject to impeachment and removal
- Number of positions: 9 (by statute)
- Website: supremecourt.gov

This is a list of cases reported in volume 21 (8 Wheat.) of United States Reports, decided by the Supreme Court of the United States in 1823.

== Nominative reports ==
In 1874, the U.S. government created the United States Reports, and retroactively numbered older privately published case reports as part of the new series. As a result, cases appearing in volumes 1–90 of U.S. Reports have dual citation forms; one for the volume number of U.S. Reports, and one for the volume number of the reports named for the relevant reporter of decisions (these are called "nominative reports").

=== Henry Wheaton ===
Starting with the 14th volume of U.S. Reports, the Reporter of Decisions of the Supreme Court of the United States was Henry Wheaton. Wheaton was Reporter of Decisions from 1816 to 1827, covering volumes 14 through 25 of United States Reports which correspond to volumes 1 through 12 of his Wheaton's Reports. As such, the dual form of citation to, for example, Sexton v. Wheaton is 21 U.S. (8 Wheat.) 229 (1823).

== Justices of the Supreme Court at the time of 21 U.S. (8 Wheat.) ==
The Supreme Court is established by Article III, Section 1 of the Constitution of the United States, which says: "The judicial Power of the United States, shall be vested in one supreme Court . . .". The size of the Court is not specified; the Constitution leaves it to Congress to set the number of justices. Under the Judiciary Act of 1789 Congress originally fixed the number of justices at six (one chief justice and five associate justices). Since 1789 Congress has varied the size of the Court from six to seven, nine, ten, and back to nine justices (always including one chief justice).

When the cases in 21 U.S. (8 Wheat.) were decided, the Court comprised these seven justices:

| Portrait | Justice | Office | Home State | Succeeded | Date confirmed by the Senate (Vote) | Tenure on Supreme Court |
|---|---|---|---|---|---|---|
| | John Marshall | Chief Justice | Virginia | Oliver Ellsworth | January 27, 1801 (Acclamation) | February 4, 1801 – July 6, 1835 (Died) |
| | Bushrod Washington | Associate Justice | Virginia | James Wilson | December 20, 1798 (Acclamation) | November 9, 1798 (Recess Appointment) – November 26, 1829 (Died) |
| | William Johnson | Associate Justice | South Carolina | Alfred Moore | March 24, 1804 (Acclamation) | May 7, 1804 – August 4, 1834 (Died) |
| | Henry Brockholst Livingston | Associate Justice | New York | William Paterson | December 17, 1806 (Acclamation) | January 20, 1807 – March 18, 1823 (Died) |
| | Thomas Todd | Associate Justice | Kentucky | new seat | March 2, 1807 (Acclamation) | March 3, 1807 – February 7, 1826 (Died) |
| | Gabriel Duvall | Associate Justice | Maryland | Samuel Chase | November 18, 1811 (Acclamation) | November 23, 1811 – January 12, 1835 (Resigned) |
| | Joseph Story | Associate Justice | Massachusetts | William Cushing | November 18, 1811 (Acclamation) | February 3, 1812 – September 10, 1845 (Died) |

== Notable Case in 21 U.S. (8 Wheat.) ==
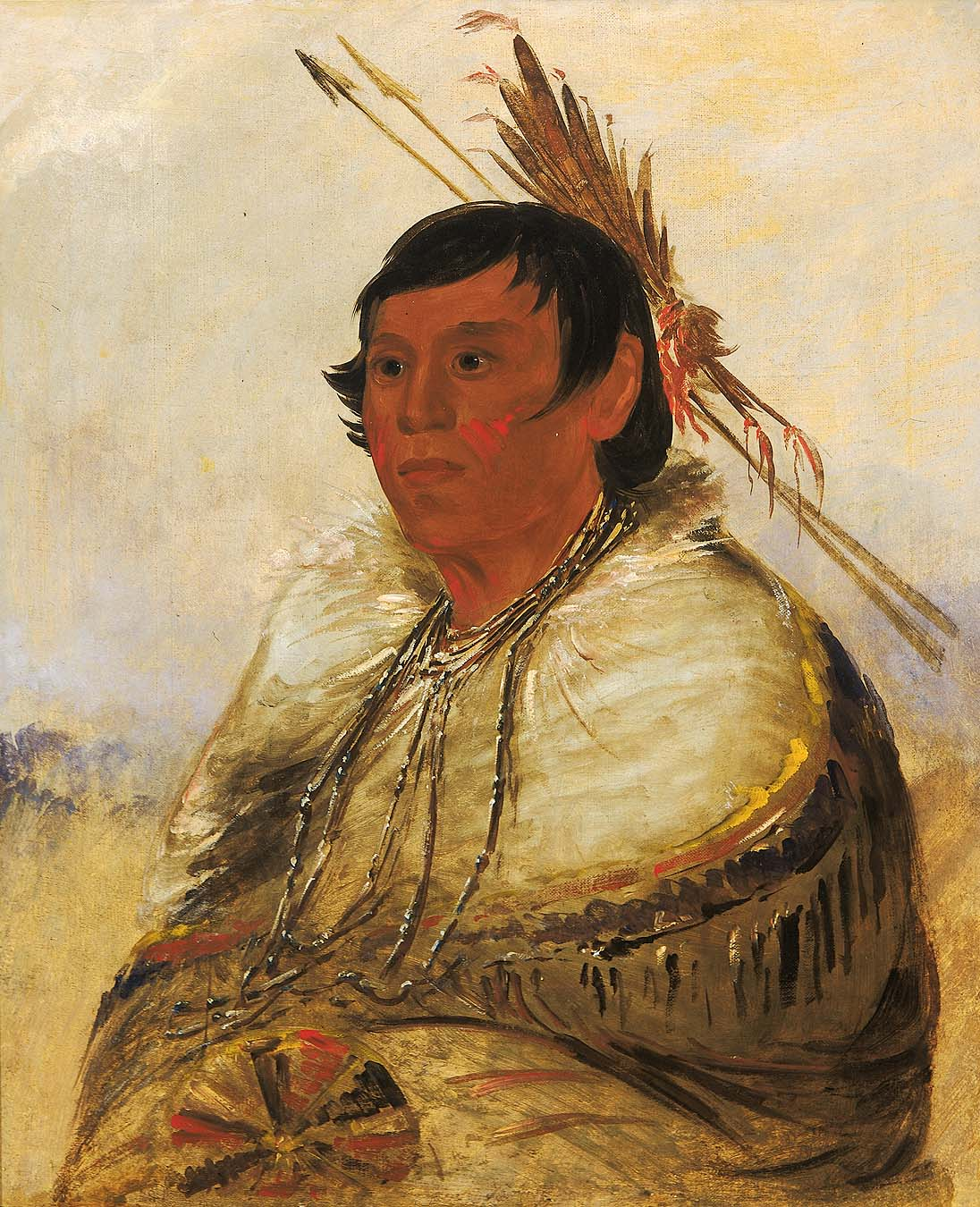
Portrait of a Piankeshaw brave

=== Johnson's Lessee v. McIntosh ===
Johnson's Lessee v. McIntosh, 21 U.S. (8 Wheat.) 543 (1823), is a landmark decision of the U.S. Supreme Court which held private citizens could not purchase lands from Native Americans. The litigation began when the successor in interest to a private purchase from the Piankeshaw attempted to maintain an action of ejectment against the holder of a federal land patent. The case is one of the most influential decisions of the Marshall Court. Marshall's opinion lays down the foundations of the doctrine of aboriginal title in the United States, and the related doctrine of discovery. What the opinion holds as to aboriginal title is that it is inalienable, a principle that remains well-established law in nearly all common law jurisdictions.

== Citation style ==
Under the Judiciary Act of 1789 the federal court structure at the time comprised District Courts, which had general trial jurisdiction; Circuit Courts, which had mixed trial and appellate (from the US District Courts) jurisdiction; and the United States Supreme Court, which had appellate jurisdiction over the federal District and Circuit courts—and for certain issues over state courts. The Supreme Court also had limited original jurisdiction (i.e., in which cases could be filed directly with the Supreme Court without first having been heard by a lower federal or state court). There were one or more federal District Courts and/or Circuit Courts in each state, territory, or other geographical region.

Bluebook citation style is used for case names, citations, and jurisdictions.

- "C.C.D." = United States Circuit Court for the District of . . .
  - e.g.,"C.C.D.N.J." = United States Circuit Court for the District of New Jersey
- "D." = United States District Court for the District of . . .
  - e.g.,"D. Mass." = United States District Court for the District of Massachusetts
- "E." = Eastern; "M." = Middle; "N." = Northern; "S." = Southern; "W." = Western
  - e.g.,"C.C.S.D.N.Y." = United States Circuit Court for the Southern District of New York
  - e.g.,"M.D. Ala." = United States District Court for the Middle District of Alabama
- "Ct. Cl." = United States Court of Claims
- The abbreviation of a state's name alone indicates the highest appellate court in that state's judiciary at the time.
  - e.g.,"Pa." = Supreme Court of Pennsylvania
  - e.g.,"Me." = Supreme Judicial Court of Maine

== List of cases in 21 U.S. (8 Wheat.) ==
| Case Name | Page and year | Opinion of the Court | Concurring opinion(s) | Dissenting opinion(s) | Lower court | Disposition |
|---|---|---|---|---|---|---|
| Green v. Biddle | 1 (1823) | Washington | Johnson | none | C.C.D. Ky. | certification |
| La Nereyda | 108 (1823) | Story | none | none | C.C.D. Md. | reversed |
| Hunt v. Rousmanier's Administrators | 174 (1823) | Marshall | none | none | C.C.D.R.I. | reversed |
| Goldsborough v. Orr | 217 (1823) | Story | none | none | C.C.D.C. | affirmed |
| Sexton v. Wheaton | 229 (1823) | Marshall | none | none | C.C.D.C. | affirmed |
| United States v. Wilson | 253 (1823) | per curiam | none | none | C.C.S.D.N.Y. | certification |
| Greeley v. United States | 257 (1823) | per curiam | none | none | C.C.D. Me. | certification |
| The Experiment | 261 (1823) | Story | none | none | C.C.D. Mass. | affirmed |
| Spring v. South Carolina Insurance Company | 268 (1823) | Livingston | none | none | C.C.D.S.C. | reversed |
| Hughes v. Union Insurance Company | 294 (1823) | Johnson | none | none | C.C.D. Md. | reversed |
| Buel v. Van Ness | 312 (1823) | Johnson | none | none | Vt. | reversed |
| Nicholls v. Webb | 326 (1823) | Story | none | none | D. La. | affirmed |
| Fleckner v. Second Bank of the United States | 338 (1823) | Story | none | none | D. La. | affirmed |
| Nicholas v. Anderson | 365 (1823) | Story | none | none | C.C.D. Ky. | affirmed |
| The Pitt | 371 (1823) | Johnson | none | none | C.C.D. Del. | affirmed |
| The Mary Ann Plumer | 380 (1823) | Marshall | none | none | D. La. | reversed |
| The Sarah Hazard | 391 (1823) | Marshall | none | none | D. La. | reversed |
| The Frances | 398 (1823) | Duvall | none | none | D. La. | reversed |
| The Luminary L'Amoureaux | 407 (1823) | Story | none | Johnson | D. La. | affirmed |
| Wallace v. Wormley | 421 (1823) | Story | Johnson | none | C.C.D. Va. | affirmed |
| United Society Partners in the Gospel v. Town of New-Haven | 464 (1823) | Washington | none | none | C.C.D. Vt. | certification |
| Daly's Lessee v. James | 495 (1823) | Washington | Johnson | none | C.C.D. Pa. | affirmed |
| Johnson's Lessee v. McIntosh | 543 (1823) | Marshall | none | none | D. Ill. | affirmed |
| Gracie v. Palmer | 605 (1823) | Johnson | none | none | C.C.E.D. Pa. | reversed |
| Childress v. Emory | 642 (1823) | Story | none | none | C.C.D.W. Tenn. | affirmed |
| Siglar v. Haywood | 675 (1823) | Marshall | none | none | C.C.D.E. Tenn. | reversed |
| City of Washington v. Francis | 681 (1823) | Johnson | none | none | C.C.D.C. | affirmed |
| Sneed v. Wister | 690 (1823) | Washington | none | none | C.C.D. Ky. | affirmed |
| Hugh v. Higgs | 697 (1823) | Marshall | none | none | C.C.D.C. | reversed |
| Gracie v. Palmer | 699 (1823) | Marshall | none | none | C.C.E.D. Pa. | dismissal denied |

== See also ==
- certificate of division
