= Evans v. Hettich =

- Supreme Court of the United States

Decided March 20, 1822
- Full case name: Oliver Evans v. Hettich
- Citations: 20 U.S. 453 (more) 7 Wheat. 453; 5 L. Ed. 496; 1822 U.S. LEXIS 267

Case history
- Prior: Writ of error from District of Pennsylvania
- Subsequent: None

Holding
- "[A] person being subject to fits of derangement, is no objection either to his competency or credibility, if he is sane at the time of giving his testimony."

Court membership
- Chief Justice John Marshall Associate Justices Bushrod Washington · William Johnson; H. Brockholst Livingston · Thomas Todd; Gabriel Duvall · Joseph Story

Case opinion
- Majority: Story, joined by unanimous

Laws applied
- Patent Act of 1793, An Act for the Relief of Oliver Evans)

Evans v. Hettich, 20 U.S. (7 Wheat.) 453 (1822), was a United States Supreme Court case in which the Court held that a witness's testimony could not be objected to merely because the witness suffered from "fits of derangement", as long as the witness was sane when he testified.

The case was the last of four successive Supreme Court cases related specifically to the Oliver Evans flour mill patent, and the second such case to be decided on the same day, following Evans v. Eaton. Altogether the Evans patent generated twelve reported decisions from 1807 to 1822, making it "one of the most litigated patents in U.S. history".

Because the arguments in the case addressed the same substantive issues of law as in Evans v. Eaton, the opinion in the case dealt only with certain procedural objections that Evans raised against the proceedings in the trial court. In particular, the Supreme Court focused on the trial court's refusal to allow Evans to raise the question of whether one of the defendant's witnesses was subject to fits of derangement.

The case is among several from the Marshall Court in which, when ruling on questions of evidence law, the Court "[wrote] magisterial opinions that cited no authority at all."

== Background ==
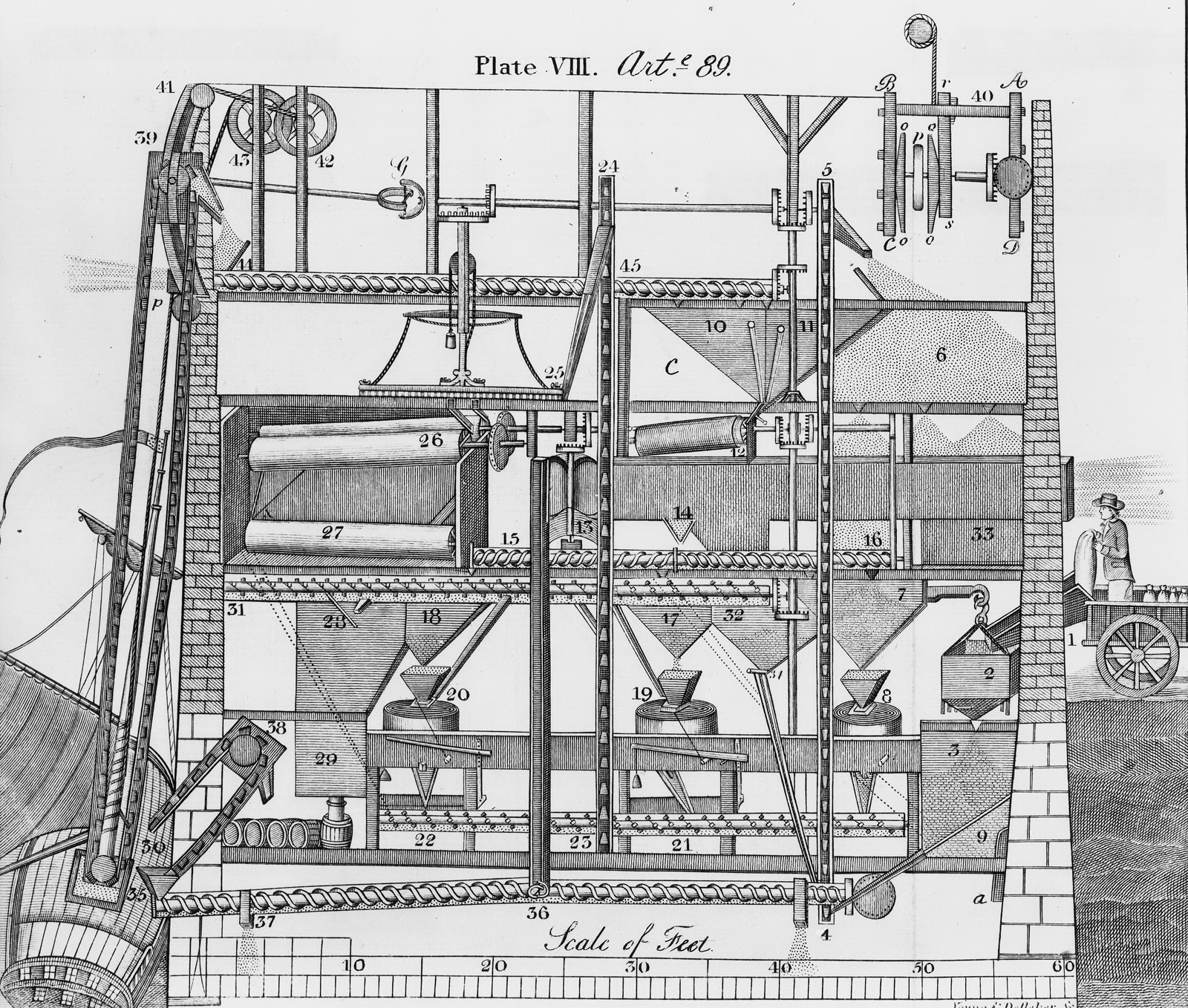
Evans' automated flour mill.

In the 1780s, inventor Oliver Evans developed a system for an automated flour mill that would revolutionize milling technology. After keeping his invention a secret while he reduced it to practice, he initially obtained protection for it through individual state statutes, for example in Maryland and New Hampshire, because the patent system did not yet exist. When the Patent Act of 1790 took effect, Evans obtained the third United States patent ever issued. No copies of this original patent are extant.

As all patents at the time had 14-year terms, his patent lapsed in 1804, and the invention entered the public domain. Immediately upon the expiration of his patent, he sought a private bill that would allow him to renew it, the first such request ever made. He was unsuccessful until 1808 when the Tenth Congress passed a law authorizing the Secretary of State to grant him a new patent on the same terms as the original one. Evans obtained his new patent the day after the law took effect.

In Evans v. Jordan, 13 U.S. 199 (1815), the Supreme Court ruled that millers who had installed Evans' invention after the expiration of the original patent but before it was reinstated were liable for infringement if they continued to use the technology. This led to a national firestorm of litigation and controversy between Evans and numerous millers, of which this case and Evans v. Eaton were two examples.

In the district court for Pennsylvania, the defendant Hettich claimed that he did not use Evans' hopperboy, but instead used the earlier Stouffer hopperboy. The trial was presided over by Justice Bushrod Washington, who had a history of hostility to Evans' patent litigation. Persuaded that the patent could only cover the improved method as a whole, rather than any of the improved machines, Justice Washington instructed the jury in such a way that the jurors had no choice but to return a verdict for the defendant, as they did.

Evans then appealed to the Supreme Court on a writ of error. He alleged the same substantive errors as in Evans v. Eaton, and also alleged procedural errors in admitting and refusing to admit certain testimony.

Evans died two years before the Supreme Court ruled on either this case or his second appeal in Evans v. Eaton.

== Opinion of the Court ==
Justice Joseph Story wrote for the court majority. No dissenting opinion is recorded. Since the questions of substantive patent law had been dealt with in Evans v. Eaton (1822), Justice Story confined himself to Evans' procedural objections. Evans' first objection, that the trial court had improperly admitted the testimony of a witness who would benefit from the patent being invalidated, was rejected on the same grounds as in Evans v. Eaton, namely, that simply having a stake in the underlying legal issue was not enough to disqualify a witness. Justice Story also upheld Justice Washington's decision to bar questions regarding whether Daniel Stouffer (the inventor of the Stouffer hopperboy) had paid Evans for a license since Stouffer was not on trial. He additionally upheld the decision to refuse to allow Evans to object to an affidavit submitted by the defendant, on the same grounds that the court had subsequently allowed the defendant to challenge an affidavit submitted by Evans because Evans had already allowed the affidavit to be entered into evidence.

On the final objection, that the trial court had improperly prevented Evans from asking whether Stouffer (who may or may not have been a witness) was subject to "fits of derangement", Justice Story made the one widely cited pronouncement in the case:

[T]he question was properly overruled, because a person is subject to fits of derangement, is no objection either to his competency or credibility if he is sane at the time of giving his testimony.

== Subsequent developments ==
Evans v. Hettich has been cited by only one subsequent Supreme Court opinion, in the 1850 case of Grove v. Brien.

== Works cited ==
- Federico, P.J. (1945). "The Patent Trials of Oliver Evans - Part I". Journal of the Patent Office Society. 27: 586.
- Federico, P.J. (1945). "The Patent Trials of Oliver Evans - Part II". Journal of the Patent Office Society. 27: 657.
