= List of United States Supreme Court cases, volume 10 =

Supreme Court of the United States
- Interactive map of Supreme Court of the United States
- 38°53′26″N 77°00′16″W
- Established: March 4, 1789; 237 years ago
- Location: Washington, D.C.
- Coordinates: 38°53′26″N 77°00′16″W
- Composition method: Presidential nomination with Senate confirmation
- Authorised by: Constitution of the United States, Art. III, § 1
- Judge term length: life tenure, subject to impeachment and removal
- Number of positions: 9 (by statute)
- Website: supremecourt.gov

This is a list of cases reported in volume 10 (6 Cranch) of United States Reports, decided by the Supreme Court of the United States in 1810.

== Nominative reports ==
In 1874, the U.S. government created the United States Reports, and retroactively numbered older privately published case reports as part of the new series. As a result, cases appearing in volumes 1–90 of U.S. Reports have dual citation forms; one for the volume number of U.S. Reports, and one for the volume number of the reports named for the relevant reporter of decisions (these are called "nominative reports").

=== William Cranch ===
Starting with the 5th volume of U.S. Reports, the Reporter of Decisions of the Supreme Court of the United States was William Cranch. Cranch was Reporter of Decisions from 1801 to 1815, covering volumes 5 through 13 of United States Reports which correspond to volumes 1 through 9 of his Cranch's Reports. As such, the complete citation to, for example, Field v. Holland is 10 U.S. (6 Cranch) 8 (1810).

== Justices of the Supreme Court at the time of 10 U.S. (6 Cranch) ==
The Supreme Court is established by Article III, Section 1 of the Constitution of the United States, which says: "The judicial Power of the United States, shall be vested in one supreme Court . . .". The size of the Court is not specified; the Constitution leaves it to Congress to set the number of justices. Under the Judiciary Act of 1789 Congress originally fixed the number of justices at six (one chief justice and five associate justices). Since 1789 Congress has varied the size of the Court from six to seven, nine, ten, and back to nine justices (always including one chief justice).

When the cases in 10 U.S. (6 Cranch) were decided, the Court comprised these seven justices:

Portrait	Justice	Office	Home State	Succeeded	Date confirmed by the Senate (Vote)	Tenure on Supreme Court
	John Marshall	Chief Justice	Virginia	Oliver Ellsworth	January 27, 1801 (Acclamation)	February 4, 1801 – July 6, 1835 (Died)
	William Cushing	Associate Justice	Massachusetts	original seat established	September 26, 1789 (Acclamation)	February 2, 1790 – September 13, 1810 (Died)
	Samuel Chase	Associate Justice	Maryland	John Blair, Jr.	January 27, 1796 (Acclamation)	February 4, 1796 – June 19, 1811 (Died)
	Bushrod Washington	Associate Justice	Virginia	James Wilson	December 20, 1798 (Acclamation)	November 9, 1798 (Recess Appointment) – November 26, 1829 (Died)
	William Johnson	Associate Justice	South Carolina	Alfred Moore	March 24, 1804 (Acclamation)	May 7, 1804 – August 4, 1834 (Died)
	Henry Brockholst Livingston	Associate Justice	New York	William Paterson	December 17, 1806 (Acclamation)	January 20, 1807 – March 18, 1823 (Died)
	Thomas Todd	Associate Justice	Kentucky	new seat	March 2, 1807 (Acclamation)	March 3, 1807 – February 7, 1826 (Died)

== Notable cases in 10 U.S. (6 Cranch) ==
=== Fletcher v. Peck ===
In Fletcher v. Peck, 10 U.S. (6 Cranch) 87 (1810), for the first time the Court held a state law to be unconstitutional (in Marbury v. Madison, 5 U.S. (1 Cranch) 137 (1803), the Supreme Court had for the first time held a federal law to be unconstitutional). The Court in Fletcher helped create a line of precedents supporting the sanctity of contracts, and hinted that Native Americans did not hold complete title to their own lands.

=== Tyler v. Tuel ===
In Tyler v. Tuel, 10 U.S. (6 Cranch) 324 (1810), the Court held that an assignee of a geographically limited patent right could not bring an action in the assignee's own name. It was the first published Supreme Court decision on patent law. Like other Supreme Court patent cases prior to Evans v. Eaton, 16 U.S. (3 Wheat.) 454 (1818), however, it did not deal with substantive patent law, but only with the law of patent assignment.

== Citation style ==
Under the Judiciary Act of 1789 the federal court structure at the time comprised District Courts, which had general trial jurisdiction; Circuit Courts, which had mixed trial and appellate (from the US District Courts) jurisdiction; and the United States Supreme Court, which had appellate jurisdiction over the federal District and Circuit courts—and for certain issues over state courts. The Supreme Court also had limited original jurisdiction (i.e., in which cases could be filed directly with the Supreme Court without first having been heard by a lower federal or state court). There were one or more federal District Courts and/or Circuit Courts in each state, territory, or other geographical region.

Bluebook citation style is used for case names, citations, and jurisdictions.

- "C.C.D." = United States Circuit Court for the District of . . .
  - e.g.,"C.C.D.N.J." = United States Circuit Court for the District of New Jersey
- "D." = United States District Court for the District of . . .
  - e.g.,"D. Mass." = United States District Court for the District of Massachusetts
- "E." = Eastern; "M." = Middle; "N." = Northern; "S." = Southern; "W." = Western
  - e.g.,"C.C.S.D.N.Y." = United States Circuit Court for the Southern District of New York
  - e.g.,"M.D. Ala." = United States District Court for the Middle District of Alabama
- "Ct. Cl." = United States Court of Claims
- The abbreviation of a state's name alone indicates the highest appellate court in that state's judiciary at the time.
  - e.g.,"Pa." = Supreme Court of Pennsylvania
  - e.g.,"Me." = Supreme Judicial Court of Maine

== List of cases in 10 U.S. (6 Cranch) ==
Case Name	Page and year	Opinion of the Court	Concurring opinion(s)	Dissenting opinion(s)	Lower court	Disposition
Scott v. Ben	3 (1810)	Marshall	none	none	C.C.D.C.	reversed
Field v. Holland	8 (1810)	Marshall	none	none	C.C.D. Ga.	affirmed
Maryland Insurance Company v. Woods	29 (1810)	Marshall	none	none	C.C.D. Md.	reversed
Young v. Grundy	51 (1810)	Marshall	none	none	C.C.D. Ky.	dismissed
Ex parte Wilson	52 (1810)	Marshall	none	none	C.C.D.C.	habeas corpus denied
Oneale v. Thornton	53 (1810)	Marshall	none	none	C.C.D.C.	reversed
King v. Delaware Insurance Company	71 (1810)	Marshall	none	none	C.C.D. Pa.	affirmed
Lewis v. Harwood	82 (1810)	Livingston	none	none	C.C.D. Va.	reversed
Riddle and Company v. Mandeville	86 (1810)	Marshall	none	none	C.C.D.C.	certification
Fletcher v. Peck	87 (1810)	Marshall	Johnson	none	C.C.D. Md.	affirmed
Massie v. Watts	148 (1810)	Marshall	none	none	C.C.D. Ky.	affirmed
United States v. Hall	171 (1810)	Marshall	none	none	C.C.D. Pa.	affirmed
Campbell v. Gordon	176 (1810)	Washington	none	none	C.C.D. Va.	affirmed
M'Knight v. Craig's Administrator	183 (1810)	Marshall	none	none	C.C.D.C.	reversed
Kennedy v. Brent	187 (1810)	Marshall	none	none	C.C.D.C.	affirmed
Korn v. Mutual Assurance Society	192 (1810)	Johnson	none	none	C.C.D.C.	affirmed
Atkinson v. Mutual Assurance Society	202 (1810)	Johnson	none	none	not indicated	reversed
Stewart v. Anderson	203 (1810)	Marshall	none	none	C.C.D.C.	affirmed
The Ship Helen	203 (1810)	per curiam	none	none	not indicated	affirmed
Marine Insurance Company v. Hodgson	206 (1810)	Livingston	none	none	C.C.D.C.	affirmed
Slacum v. Pomery	221 (1810)	Marshall	none	none	C.C.D.C.	certification
Vasse v. Smith	226 (1810)	Marshall	none	none	C.C.D.C.	reversed
Custiss v. Georgetown and Alexandria Turnpike Company	233 (1810)	Marshall	none	none	C.C.D.C.	reversed
Lodge's Lessee v. Lee	237 (1810)	per curiam	none	none	not indicated	affirmed
Finley v. Lynn	238 (1810)	Marshall	Todd (in part)	Todd (in part)	C.C.D.C.	reversed
De Butts v. Bacon	252 (1810)	per curiam	none	none	C.C.D.C.	affirmed
Sheehy v. Mandeville	253 (1810)	Marshall	none	none	C.C.D.C.	reversed
Skillern's Executors v. May's Executors	267 (1810)	per curiam	none	none	C.C.D. Ky.	remanded
Chesapeake Insurance Company v. Stark	268 (1810)	Marshall	none	none	C.C.D. Md.	reversed
Livingston v. Maryland Insurance Company	274 (1810)	Marshall	none	none	C.C.D. Md.	reversed
Hudson v. Guestier	281 (1810)	Livingston	Todd	Marshall	C.C.D. Md.	affirmed
Smith v. Maryland ex rel. Caroll	286 (1810)	Washington	none	none	Md.	affirmed
Durousseau v. United States	307 (1810)	Marshall	Livingston, Johnson	none	D. Orleans	reversed
Tyler v. Tuel	324 (1810)	per curiam	none	none	C.C.D. Vt.	arrest of judgment
The Schooner Juliana	327 (1810)	per curiam	none	none	C.C.D. Md.	reversed
The Schooner Rachel	329 (1810)	per curiam	none	none	D. Orleans	certification
The Brigantine Amiable Lucy	330 (1810)	per curiam	none	none	D. Orleans	reversed
Sere v. Pitot	332 (1810)	Marshall	none	none	D. Orleans	affirmed
Maryland Insurance Company v. Ruden's Administrator	338 (1810)	Marshall	none	none	C.C.D. Md.	affirmed

== See also ==
- certificate of division
