= Tyler v. Tuel =

- Supreme Court of the United States

Decided February 1, 1810
- Full case name: Tyler and Others v. Tuel
- Citations: 10 U.S. 324 (more) 6 Cranch 324; 3 L. Ed. 237

Case history
- Prior: Certificate of division from the District of Vermont
- Subsequent: None

Court membership
- Chief Justice John Marshall Associate Justices William Cushing · Samuel Chase; Bushrod Washington · William Johnson; H. Brockholst Livingston · Thomas Todd

Case opinion
- Per curiam

Laws applied
- Patent Act of 1793
- Superseded by
- Patent Act of 1836

Tyler v. Tuel, 10 U.S. (6 Cranch) 324 (1810), was a United States Supreme Court case in which the court held that an assignee of a geographically limited patent right could not bring an action in the assignee's own name. It was the first published Supreme Court decision on patent law. Like other Supreme Court patent cases prior to Evans v. Eaton, 16 U.S. (3 Wheat.) 454 (1818), however, it did not deal with substantive patent law, but only with the law of patent assignment.

== Background ==
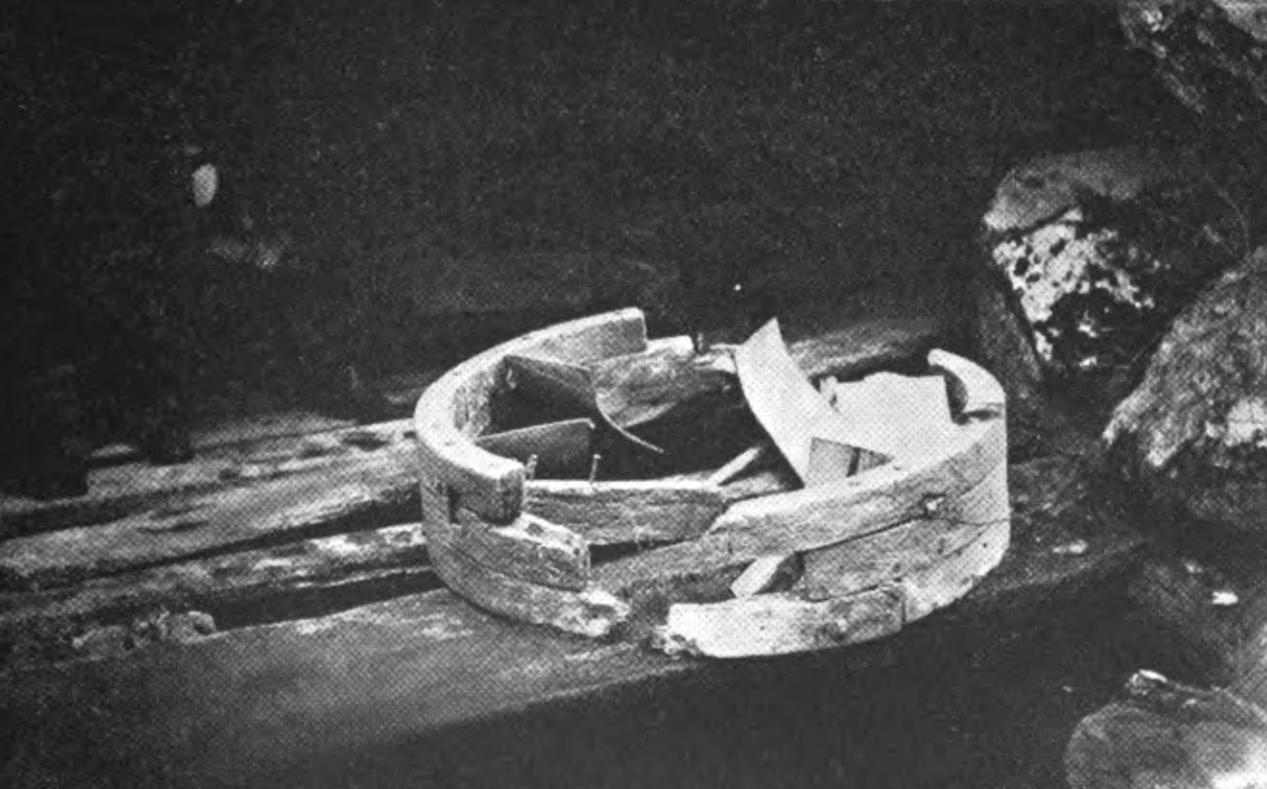
Remains of a "wry fly" wheel according to Tyler's invention.

On February 20, 1800, the West Claremont, New Hampshire inventor Benjamin Tyler obtained a patent on a new type of tub wheel, or horizontal water wheel, that he termed the "wry fly". Tyler later became better known for his second patent on this basic concept, issued in 1804. Due to the later Patent Office fire, official records of these patents no longer survive. However, the invention was highly influential and anticipated many features of later turbines.

Tyler assigned his right and interest in the 1800 patent to others for $6,000, but reserved to himself the right of use and sale within Chittenden, Addison, Rutland, and Windham counties in Vermont.

Tyler's assignees brought suit against the defendant Tuel in the District of Vermont for infringing the 1800 patent. They won at trial, but after the verdict was issued, Tuel filed a motion in arrest of judgment, arguing that the assignees never had legal standing to bring the suit, because they were not the assignees of the entire original right and interest in the patent. The district judges were divided on whether to grant the motion or not, and therefore the question went to the Supreme Court on a certificate of division.

== Opinion of the court ==
As was common in the patent jurisprudence of the time, the court applied principles of property law to the issue. Under section 4 of the Patent Act of 1793, an assignee could bring suit against an infringer but a licensee could not. Under the common law, an "assignment" only existed if the entire right and interest was assigned.

The court's certified opinion therefore consisted of one sentence:

It is the opinion of the Court that the plaintiffs, by their own showing, are not legal assignees to maintain this action in their own names, and that the judgment of the circuit court be arrested.

== Subsequent developments ==
Tyler has been cited in fewer than a dozen cases since it was written. The Tyler rule was abrogated by the Patent Act of 1836. In consequence, Tyler has seldom been cited since the 1830s, except in historical reviews. In 1868, the Supreme Court noted Tyler's obsolescence in Moore v. Marsh, 74 U.S. (7 Wall.) 515 (1868).

The 1836 act, however, only affected geographically divided interests. The Supreme Court therefore continued throughout the 19th century to hold that an assignment that was divided in any non-geographical way was a license rather than an assignment and did not confer standing.

Under the Tyler rule, an assignee of a geographical part interest could not bring suit in the assignee's own name. Justice Story clarified the Tyler rule in a district court opinion in Whittemore v. Cutter, ruling that Tyler did not apply to the transferee of an undivided part interest.
