= Thomas Todd (disambiguation) =

Thomas Todd (1765–1826) was a justice of the United States Supreme Court, 1807–1826.

Thomas, Tom or Tommy Todd may also refer to:

== People ==
- Thomas Todd (piper) (c. 1832–1903), player of the Northumbrian smallpipes
- Tommy Todd (footballer) (1926–2014), Scottish footballer
- Tommy Todd (politician) (1927–2018), American politician
- Thomas Wingate Todd (1885–1938), English orthodontist
- Thomas H. Todd III, United States Army general

== Ships ==
- SS Thomas Todd, a Liberty ship
