= Evans v. Eaton =

Evans v. Eaton could refer to:

- Evans v. Eaton (1818), 16 U.S. (3 Wheat.) 454, on patent anticipation and scope
- Evans v. Eaton (1822), 20 U.S. (7 Wheat.) 356, on the need for patented improvements to be distinctly claimed
