= List of United States Supreme Court cases, volume 13 =

Supreme Court of the United States
- Interactive map of Supreme Court of the United States
- 38°53′26″N 77°00′16″W
- Established: March 4, 1789; 237 years ago
- Location: Washington, D.C.
- Coordinates: 38°53′26″N 77°00′16″W
- Composition method: Presidential nomination with Senate confirmation
- Authorised by: Constitution of the United States, Art. III, § 1
- Judge term length: life tenure, subject to impeachment and removal
- Number of positions: 9 (by statute)
- Website: supremecourt.gov

This is a list of cases reported in volume 13 (9 Cranch) of United States Reports, decided by the Supreme Court of the United States in 1815.

== Nominative reports ==
In 1874, the U.S. government created the United States Reports, and retroactively numbered older privately published case reports as part of the new series. As a result, cases appearing in volumes 1–90 of U.S. Reports have dual citation forms; one for the volume number of U.S. Reports, and one for the volume number of the reports named for the relevant reporter of decisions (these are called "nominative reports").

=== William Cranch ===
Starting with the 5th volume of U.S. Reports, the Reporter of Decisions of the Supreme Court of the United States was William Cranch. Cranch was Reporter of Decisions from 1801 to 1815, covering volumes 5 through 13 of United States Reports which correspond to volumes 1 through 9 of his Cranch's Reports. As such, the dual form of citation to, for example, Terrett v. Taylor is 13 U.S. (9 Cranch) 43 (1815).

== Justices of the Supreme Court at the time of 13 U.S. (9 Cranch) ==
The Supreme Court is established by Article III, Section 1 of the Constitution of the United States, which says: "The judicial Power of the United States, shall be vested in one supreme Court . . .". The size of the Court is not specified; the Constitution leaves it to Congress to set the number of justices. Under the Judiciary Act of 1789 Congress originally fixed the number of justices at six (one chief justice and five associate justices). Since 1789 Congress has varied the size of the Court from six to seven, nine, ten, and back to nine justices (always including one chief justice).

When the cases in 13 U.S. (9 Cranch) were decided, the Court comprised these seven justices:

Portrait	Justice	Office	Home State	Succeeded	Date confirmed by the Senate (Vote)	Tenure on Supreme Court
	John Marshall	Chief Justice	Virginia	Oliver Ellsworth	January 27, 1801 (Acclamation)	February 4, 1801 – July 6, 1835 (Died)
	Bushrod Washington	Associate Justice	Virginia	James Wilson	December 20, 1798 (Acclamation)	November 9, 1798 (Recess Appointment) – November 26, 1829 (Died)
	William Johnson	Associate Justice	South Carolina	Alfred Moore	March 24, 1804 (Acclamation)	May 7, 1804 – August 4, 1834 (Died)
	Henry Brockholst Livingston	Associate Justice	New York	William Paterson	December 17, 1806 (Acclamation)	January 20, 1807 – March 18, 1823 (Died)
	Thomas Todd	Associate Justice	Kentucky	new seat	March 2, 1807 (Acclamation)	March 3, 1807 – February 7, 1826 (Died)
	Gabriel Duvall	Associate Justice	Maryland	Samuel Chase	November 18, 1811 (Acclamation)	November 23, 1811 – January 12, 1835 (Resigned)
	Joseph Story	Associate Justice	Massachusetts	William Cushing	November 18, 1811 (Acclamation)	February 3, 1812 – September 10, 1845 (Died)

== Citation style ==
Under the Judiciary Act of 1789 the federal court structure at the time comprised District Courts, which had general trial jurisdiction; Circuit Courts, which had mixed trial and appellate (from the US District Courts) jurisdiction; and the United States Supreme Court, which had appellate jurisdiction over the federal District and Circuit courts—and for certain issues over state courts. The Supreme Court also had limited original jurisdiction (i.e., in which cases could be filed directly with the Supreme Court without first having been heard by a lower federal or state court). There were one or more federal District Courts and/or Circuit Courts in each state, territory, or other geographical region.

Bluebook citation style is used for case names, citations, and jurisdictions.

- "C.C.D." = United States Circuit Court for the District of . . .
  - e.g.,"C.C.D.N.J." = United States Circuit Court for the District of New Jersey
- "D." = United States District Court for the District of . . .
  - e.g.,"D. Mass." = United States District Court for the District of Massachusetts
- "E." = Eastern; "M." = Middle; "N." = Northern; "S." = Southern; "W." = Western
  - e.g.,"C.C.S.D.N.Y." = United States Circuit Court for the Southern District of New York
  - e.g.,"M.D. Ala." = United States District Court for the Middle District of Alabama
- "Ct. Cl." = United States Court of Claims
- The abbreviation of a state's name alone indicates the highest appellate court in that state's judiciary at the time.
  - e.g.,"Pa." = Supreme Court of Pennsylvania
  - e.g.,"Me." = Supreme Judicial Court of Maine

== List of cases in 13 U.S. (9 Cranch) ==
Case Name	Page & year	Opinion of the Court	Concurring opinion(s)	Dissenting opinion(s)	Lower Court	Disposition
Mandeville v. Union Bank	9 (1815)	Marshall	none	none	C.C.D.C.	affirmed
Meigs v. M'clung's Lessee	11 (1815)	Marshall	none	none	C.C.D.E. Tenn.	affirmed
Simms v. Guthrie	19 (1815)	Marshall	none	none	C.C.D. Ky.	reversed
Speake v. United States	28 (1815)	Story	none	Livingston, Marshall	C.C.D.C.	affirmed
Taber v. Perrott	39 (1815)	Marshall	none	none	C.C.D.R.I.	reversed
Terrett v. Taylor	43 (1815)	Story	none	none	C.C.D.C.	certification
The Brig Short Staple	55 (1815)	Marshall	none	Story	C.C.D. Mass.	reversed
Parker v. Rule's Lessee	64 (1815)	Marshall	none	none	C.C.D.W. Tenn.	affirmed
The Brig Struggle	71 (1815)	Livingston	none	none	C.C.D. Mass.	affirmed
Randolph v. Donaldson	76 (1815)	Story	none	none	C.C.D. Va.	reversed
Polk's Lessee v. Wendal	87 (1815)	Marshall	none	none	C.C.D.W. Tenn.	reversed
The Ship Richmond	102 (1815)	Marshall	none	none	C.C.D. Ga.	affirmed
Arnold v. United States	104 (1815)	Story	none	none	C.C.D.R.I.	affirmed
The St. Lawrence	120 (1815)	Story	none	none	C.C.D.N.H	affirmed
Drummond's Administrators v. Magruder's Trustees	122 (1815)	Washington	none	none	C.C.D. Va.	reversed
The Mary	126 (1815)	Marshall	none	none	C.C.D.R.I.	reversed
Doe v. McFarland	151 (1815)	Marshall	none	none	C.C.D. Ky.	reversed
Clark's Executors v. Van Riemsdyk	153 (1815)	Marshall	none	none	C.C.D.R.I.	reversed
Finley v. Williams	164 (1815)	Marshall	none	none	C.C.D. Ky.	reversed
McIver's Lessee v. Walker	173 (1815)	Marshall	Duvall	none	C.C.D.E. Tenn.	reversed
Owens v. Hanney	180 (1815)	Marshall	none	none	C.C.D. Ga.	affirmed
The Ship Fanny	181 (1815)	Johnson	none	none	C.C.D. Conn.	affirmed
The Frances	183 (1815)	Johnson	none	none	C.C.D.R.I.	certification
30 Hogsheads of Sugar v. Boyle	191 (1815)	Marshall	none	none	C.C.D. Md.	affirmed
Evans v. Jordan	199 (1815)	Washington	none	none	C.C.D. Va.	certification
The Ship Hazard	205 (1815)	Livingston	none	none	C.C.D. Ga.	affirmed
The Ship Societe	209 (1815)	Marshall	none	none	C.C.D. Ga.	affirmed
United States v. Giles	212 (1815)	Livingston	none	none	C.C.D.N.Y.	certification
United States v. Barber	243 (1815)	per curiam	none	none	C.C.D. Vt.	certification
The Schooner Andeline	244 (1815)	Story	none	none	C.C.D.N.Y.	certification
The Brig Ann	289 (1815)	Story	none	none	C.C.D. Conn.	affirmed
Town of Pawlet v. Clark	292 (1815)	Story	Johnson	none	C.C.D. Vt.	certification
Otis v. Watkins	339 (1815)	Livingston	none	Marshall	Mass.	reversed
The Brig Alerta	359 (1815)	Washington	none	none	D.N. Orleans	affirmed
The Grotius	368 (1815)	Washington	none	none	C.C.D. Mass.	reversed
Gettings v. Burch's Administratrix	372 (1815)	Marshall	none	none	C.C.D.C.	reversed
United States v. Bryan	374 (1815)	Livingston	none	none	C.C.D. Del.	affirmed
The Brig Concord	387 (1815)	Story	none	none	C.C.D.N.Y.	reversed
The Nereide	388 (1815)	Marshall	Johnson	Story	C.C.D.N.Y.	reversed
Pratt v. Law	456 (1815)	Johnson	none	none	C.C.D.C.	certification

== See also ==
- certificate of division
