= Terrett v. Taylor =

- Supreme Court of the United States

Decided February 17, 1815
- Full case name: Terrett and others v. Taylor and others
- Citations: 13 U.S. 43 (more) 9 Cranch 43; 3 L. Ed. 650

Case history
- Prior: Error to the United States Circuit Court of the District of Columbia

Holding
- The Virginia law confiscating the church's lands is void.

Court membership
- Chief Justice John Marshall Associate Justices Bushrod Washington · William Johnson; H. Brockholst Livingston · Thomas Todd; Gabriel Duvall · Joseph Story

Case opinion
- Majority: Story, joined by unanimous
- Johnson and Todd took no part in the consideration or decision of the case.

Terrett v. Taylor, 13 U.S. (9 Cranch) 43 (1815), was a case decided by the Supreme Court of the United States, which ruled that the Commonwealth of Virginia could not confiscate Episcopal church land.

== Background ==
The Church of England was the established church in the colony of Virginia. It was "perhaps the most rigid and exclusive establishment of religion in America" from the colony's founding until just prior to the American Revolutionary War, according to the scholar Michael W. McConnell. Terrett involved what were known as glebe lands—church lands that were rented out to individual tenants to provide revenue for the local parish minister. These lands had mostly been granted to the church by royal charter, although a few were donations. Laws passed in 1776 and 1784 affirmed that the lands belonged to the church (which became known as the Protestant Episcopal Church after the Revolution broke out). Two years later, disestablishmentarian trends led the legislature to repeal the 1784 statute, which had incorporated the church (over objections from Presbyterians and Baptists) and replace it with a provision allowing all religious groups to maintain their property and to appoint trustees to manage it. Still, non-Episcopalians viewed the situation as unfair: the Episcopal Church retained its substantial amounts of land, but other groups (which had formerly not been allowed to own property at all) had no such holdings. The fact that the shrinking Episcopal Church was associated with the British Crown and the Federalist aristocracy worsened resentments.

Jeffersonians obtained a majority in the Virginia legislature midway through the Adams administration. Believing that the Episcopalians' retention of land violated the separation of church and state, in 1798 they repealed both the 1776 law and the 1786 law on the grounds that they were "inconsistent with the principles of the constitution and of religious freedom". In 1801, the legislature passed a law claiming title to all glebe lands that were not being actively used for religious purposes; the lands were to be sold, with the proceeds to be spent to help the parish poor. Opponents of the law wished to challenge it in federal court (where most judges were Federalists) rather than in Virginia state court, so the lawsuit was filed by the vestrymen of a church in Alexandria, which had recently been ceded to the federal government to form the District of Columbia. They sued the overseers of the poor of Fairfax County, Virginia, in the federal circuit court in D.C. to quiet their title to the glebe lands. The vestrymen prevailed at trial, and the case was appealed to the Supreme Court of the United States.

== Decision ==
In an opinion by Justice Joseph Story delivered on February 17, 1815, the Court held that Virginia could not confiscate the Episcopal lands. He wrote:

[T]hat the legislature can repeal statutes creating private corporations, or confirming to them property already acquired under the faith of previous laws, and by such repeal can vest the property of such corporations exclusively in the state, or dispose of the same to such purposes as they may please, without the consent or default of the corporations, we are not prepared to admit; and we think ourselves standing upon the principles of natural justice, upon the fundamental laws of every free government, upon the spirit and the letter of the Constitution of the United States, and upon the decisions of most respectable judicial tribunals, in resisting such a doctrine.

In referencing "the spirit and the letter" of the Constitution, Story did not indicate which particular constitutional provision had been violated. The legal historian G. Edward White lists three possibilities: the Takings Clause, the Contract Clause, and a provision of Article I, Section 8 giving Congress sole authority over the District of Columbia. He dismisses the Takings Clause because it applied only to the federal government, and he infers from other language in Story's opinion that Article I, Section 8, was not intended either. Some evidence from Story's later writings suggests that the justice was referring to the Contract Clause, but the land at issue had been purchased directly from an individual, making it unclear what contract had been impaired. The historian Leonard Levy describes Terrett as "the first case and one of the very few in which the Supreme Court relied exclusively on upon the concept of a higher law as the sole basis for holding a state act unconstitutional", although the historian David Garrow suggests that Story's reference to "natural justice" was "meant only to express his moral outrage along the way to his clear conclusion" that the law violated the Constitution.

Justices Johnson and Todd were not present when the case was decided. Story commented that the decision was that of a "majority of the Court", which in White's view indicates that at least one of the other justices may have disagreed.
