= Fletcher v. Peck =

- Supreme Court of the United States

Argued February 15, 1810 Decided March 16, 1810
- Full case name: Robert Fletcher v. John Peck
- Citations: 10 U.S. 87 (more) 6 Cranch 87; 3 L. Ed. 162; 1810 U.S. LEXIS 322;

Case history
- Prior: Demurrer overruled, D. Mass
- Subsequent: None

Holding
- The Contracts Clause of the U.S. Constitution prohibited Georgia from voiding contracts for the transfer of land, even though they were secured through illegal bribery. Circuit Court for the District of Massachusetts affirmed.

Court membership
- Chief Justice John Marshall Associate Justices William Cushing · Samuel Chase; Bushrod Washington · William Johnson; H. Brockholst Livingston · Thomas Todd

Case opinions
- Majority: Marshall, joined by Cushing, Chase, Washington, Livingston, Todd
- Concur/dissent: Johnson

Laws applied
- U.S. Const. art. I, § 10, cl. 1

Fletcher v. Peck, 10 U.S. (6 Cranch) 87 (1810), is a landmark United States Supreme Court decision in which the Supreme Court first ruled a state law unconstitutional. The decision created a growing precedent for the sanctity of legal contracts and hinted that Native Americans did not hold complete title to their own lands (an idea fully realized in Johnson v. McIntosh).

== Background ==
Following the Treaty of Paris ending the American Revolution, Georgia claimed possession of the Yazoo lands, a 54,000 sq mi (140,000 km^{2}) region of the Indian Reserve, west of its own territory. The land later became the northern part of the states of Alabama and Mississippi.

In 1795, the Georgia legislature divided the area into four tracts. The state then sold the tracts to four separate land development companies for $500,000, about $0.014 per acre, and was considered a bargain even at 1790 prices. The Georgia legislature overwhelmingly approved this land grant, known as the Yazoo Land Act of 1795. However, it was later revealed that the Yazoo Land Act had been approved in return for bribes in a scandal known as the Yazoo Land Scandal. The voters rejected most of the incumbents in the next election; the new legislature, reacting to the public outcry, repealed the law and voided the transactions made under it.

Robert Fletcher bought a tract of land from John Peck after the 1795 act was repealed. Fletcher, in 1803, brought a suit against Peck, claiming that Peck had not had clear title to the land when he sold it.

There was collusion between the two. Both would have their land secured if the Supreme Court decided that Native Americans did not hold original title. Fletcher set out to win the case.

== Court ruling ==
The Supreme Court unanimously (with a separate concurring opinion written by William Johnson) ruled that the legislature's repeal of the law was unconstitutional. John Marshall wrote that the sale was a binding contract, which under Article I, Section 10, Clause I (the Contract Clause) of the Constitution cannot be invalidated even if it is illegally secured.

The ruling lent further protection to property rights against popular pressure and is the earliest case of the Court asserting its right to invalidate state laws which are in conflict with or are otherwise contrary to the Constitution. A later Chief Justice, William H. Rehnquist, wrote that Fletcher v. Peck "represented an attempt by Chief Justice Marshall to extend the protection of the contract clause to infant business".

== See also ==
- List of United States Supreme Court cases, volume 10
- Yazoo land scandal
