= Evans v. Jordan =

- Supreme Court of the United States

Decided March 2, 1815
- Full case name: Evans v. Jordan and Morehead
- Citations: 13 U.S. 199 (more) 9 Cranch 199; 3 L. Ed. 704

Case history
- Prior: Certificate of division from the District of Virginia
- Subsequent: None

Holding
- A person who copies a patented invention after the patent has expired, but before it is restored by a private law, will be liable for infringement damages for any use of the invention that continues after the patent is restored.

Court membership
- Chief Justice John Marshall Associate Justices Bushrod Washington · William Johnson; H. Brockholst Livingston · Thomas Todd; Gabriel Duvall · Joseph Story

Case opinion
- Majority: Washington, joined by unanimous

Laws applied
- Patent Act of 1800, An Act for the Relief of Oliver Evans

Evans v. Jordan, 13 U.S. (9 Cranch) 199 (1815), was a United States Supreme Court case in which the Court held that someone who had copied a patented invention after the patent had expired, and before the patent was restored by a private bill, would be liable for damages for patent infringement for any use continuing after the patent was restored. It was the second published Supreme Court decision on patent law, and the first of four Supreme Court cases dealing with the Oliver Evans flour mill patent. Like other Supreme Court patent cases prior to Evans v. Eaton, however, this case did not deal with substantive patent law, but only with issues of statutory construction and infringement liability.

== Background ==
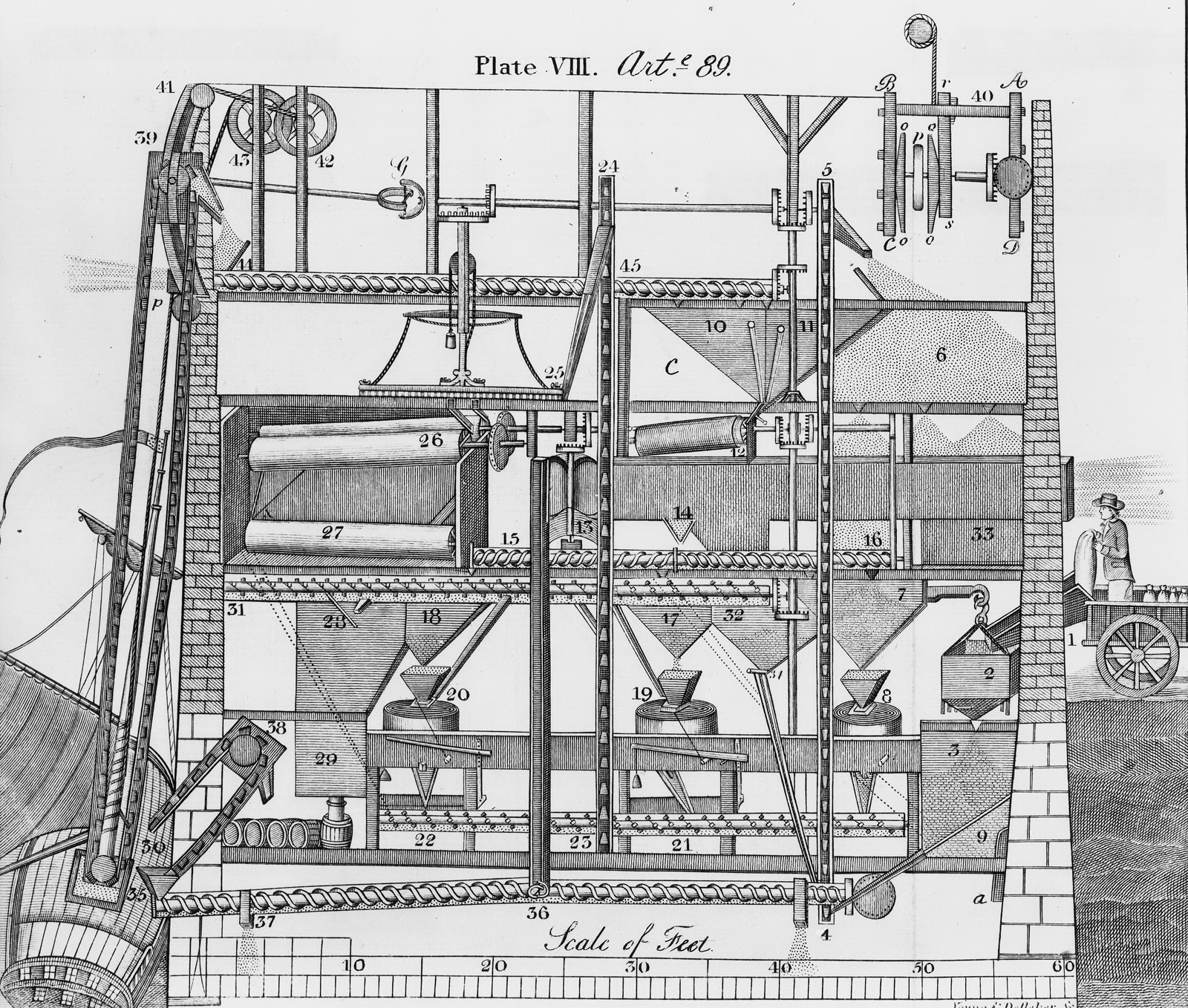
Evans' automated flour mill.

In the 1780s, prolific inventor Oliver Evans developed a system for an automated flour mill that would revolutionize milling technology. Initially keeping his invention a secret, he obtained protection for it through individual state statutes, for example in Maryland and New Hampshire, because the federal patent system did not yet exist. When the Patent Act of 1790 took effect, Evans obtained the third United States patent ever issued. No copies of the patent are extant today.

As all patents at the time had 14-year terms, Evans' patent lapsed in 1804, and the invention entered the public domain. Immediately upon the expiration of his patent, he sought a federal private bill that would allow him to renew it, the first such request ever made. He was unsuccessful until 1808, when the Tenth Congress passed a law authorizing the Secretary of State to grant him a new patent on the same terms as the original one.

Crucially for this case, however, the law contained a proviso to protect those who had used the invention since the original patent expired:

provided [...] that no person who shall have used the said improvements, or have erected the same for use before the issuing of said patent shall be liable for damages therefor.

Evans obtained his new patent on January 22, 1808, the day after the law took effect. But in the intervening years, the defendants Jordan and Morehead had constructed a mill using Evans' invention.

Evans sued Jordan and Morehead for patent infringement in the District Court of Virginia in 1810, seeking treble damages under the Patent Act amendments of 1800. Jordan and Morehead defended on the basis that they had constructed the mill while the patent was expired, and the proviso to the 1808 law specifically excluded damages for using or building the invention while the patent was expired. Therefore, the defendants urged, they should not be liable even for the continued use of the mill, since (1) such a reading would vitiate the purpose of the statute's exemption for use between 1804 and 1808, since it would effectively penalize them for having built the invention during that period, and (2) such legislation would be an unconstitutional taking, because it would effectively deprive them of the use of their lawfully constructed mill.

The circuit court was divided. Justice Marshall as circuit judge authored an opinion in favor of Evans, reasoning that the language of the statute was plain on its face: it exempted only damages for use or construction of the invention that occurred while the patent was expired, and did not give any exemption for continuing use after the patent was renewed. In particular, Marshall observed that "the act for the relief of Oliver Evans, considered independent of any former patent, would authorize him to sustain an action for the use of his invention, after the date of his patent, although the machinery itself had been constructed before its date."

However, the district judge Tucker did not agree with Marshall's reasoning. Therefore, the case went to the Supreme Court on a certificate of division.

== Opinion of the Court ==
The Court, minus Justice Todd who was absent, unanimously affirmed Justice Marshall's judgment in the district court. The opinion was authored by Justice Washington.

The court held, first, that the statute plainly did not exempt infringers from damages for a continuing infringement after the patent was renewed, and second, that any hardship caused by this result could not justify construing the statute in a way that would be at odds with its plain meaning.

The opinion followed an emerging principle in the judicial decisions of the time on statutory construction: that a statute should never be construed in such a way as to thwart the legislature's policy intent.

== Subsequent developments ==
In the 21st century, the Supreme Court has cited the case in connection with Congressional manipulations of copyright terms. It was cited to support both the 2003 opinion in Eldred v. Ashcroft, which upheld the Sonny Bono Copyright Term Extension Act, and the 2012 Supreme Court opinion in Golan v. Holder, which examined the long tradition of upholding legislative grants of intellectual property that had previously passed into the public domain.

== Works cited ==
- Federico, P.J. (1945). "The Patent Trials of Oliver Evans". Journal of the Patent Office Society. 27: 586.
