= List of United States Supreme Court cases, volume 20 =

Supreme Court of the United States
- Interactive map of Supreme Court of the United States
- 38°53′26″N 77°00′16″W
- Established: March 4, 1789; 237 years ago
- Location: Washington, D.C.
- Coordinates: 38°53′26″N 77°00′16″W
- Composition method: Presidential nomination with Senate confirmation
- Authorised by: Constitution of the United States, Art. III, § 1
- Judge term length: life tenure, subject to impeachment and removal
- Number of positions: 9 (by statute)
- Website: supremecourt.gov

This is a list of cases reported in volume 20 (7 Wheat.) of United States Reports, decided by the Supreme Court of the United States in 1822.

== Nominative reports ==
In 1874, the U.S. government created the United States Reports, and retroactively numbered older privately published case reports as part of the new series. As a result, cases appearing in volumes 1–90 of U.S. Reports have dual citation forms; one for the volume number of U.S. Reports, and one for the volume number of the reports named for the relevant reporter of decisions (these are called "nominative reports").

=== Henry Wheaton ===
Starting with the 14th volume of U.S. Reports, the Reporter of Decisions of the Supreme Court of the United States was Henry Wheaton. Wheaton was Reporter of Decisions from 1816 to 1827, covering volumes 14 through 25 of United States Reports which correspond to volumes 1 through 12 of his Wheaton's Reports. As such, the dual form of citation to, for example, Ricard v. Williams is 20 U.S. (7 Wheat.) 59 (1822).

== Justices of the Supreme Court at the time of 20 U.S. (7 Wheat.) ==
The Supreme Court is established by Article III, Section 1 of the Constitution of the United States, which says: "The judicial Power of the United States, shall be vested in one supreme Court . . .". The size of the Court is not specified; the Constitution leaves it to Congress to set the number of justices. Under the Judiciary Act of 1789 Congress originally fixed the number of justices at six (one chief justice and five associate justices). Since 1789 Congress has varied the size of the Court from six to seven, nine, ten, and back to nine justices (always including one chief justice).

When the cases in 20 U.S. (7 Wheat.) were decided, the Court comprised these seven justices:

Portrait	Justice	Office	Home State	Succeeded	Date confirmed by the Senate (Vote)	Tenure on Supreme Court
	John Marshall	Chief Justice	Virginia	Oliver Ellsworth	January 27, 1801 (Acclamation)	February 4, 1801 – July 6, 1835 (Died)
	Bushrod Washington	Associate Justice	Virginia	James Wilson	December 20, 1798 (Acclamation)	November 9, 1798 (Recess Appointment) – November 26, 1829 (Died)
	William Johnson	Associate Justice	South Carolina	Alfred Moore	March 24, 1804 (Acclamation)	May 7, 1804 – August 4, 1834 (Died)
	Henry Brockholst Livingston	Associate Justice	New York	William Paterson	December 17, 1806 (Acclamation)	January 20, 1807 – March 18, 1823 (Died)
	Thomas Todd	Associate Justice	Kentucky	new seat	March 2, 1807 (Acclamation)	March 3, 1807 – February 7, 1826 (Died)
	Gabriel Duvall	Associate Justice	Maryland	Samuel Chase	November 18, 1811 (Acclamation)	November 23, 1811 – January 12, 1835 (Resigned)
	Joseph Story	Associate Justice	Massachusetts	William Cushing	November 18, 1811 (Acclamation)	February 3, 1812 – September 10, 1845 (Died)

== Citation style ==
Under the Judiciary Act of 1789 the federal court structure at the time comprised District Courts, which had general trial jurisdiction; Circuit Courts, which had mixed trial and appellate (from the US District Courts) jurisdiction; and the United States Supreme Court, which had appellate jurisdiction over the federal District and Circuit courts—and for certain issues over state courts. The Supreme Court also had limited original jurisdiction (i.e., in which cases could be filed directly with the Supreme Court without first having been heard by a lower federal or state court). There were one or more federal District Courts and/or Circuit Courts in each state, territory, or other geographical region.

Bluebook citation style is used for case names, citations, and jurisdictions.

- "C.C.D." = United States Circuit Court for the District of . . .
  - e.g.,"C.C.D.N.J." = United States Circuit Court for the District of New Jersey
- "D." = United States District Court for the District of . . .
  - e.g.,"D. Mass." = United States District Court for the District of Massachusetts
- "E." = Eastern; "M." = Middle; "N." = Northern; "S." = Southern; "W." = Western
  - e.g.,"C.C.S.D.N.Y." = United States Circuit Court for the Southern District of New York
  - e.g.,"M.D. Ala." = United States District Court for the Middle District of Alabama
- "Ct. Cl." = United States Court of Claims
- The abbreviation of a state's name alone indicates the highest appellate court in that state's judiciary at the time.
  - e.g.,"Pa." = Supreme Court of Pennsylvania
  - e.g.,"Me." = Supreme Judicial Court of Maine

== List of cases in 20 U.S. (7 Wheat.) ==
Case Name	Page and year	Opinion of the Court	Concurring opinion(s)	Dissenting opinion(s)	Lower court	Disposition
Miller v. Kerr	1 (1822)	Todd	none	none	not indicated	affirmed
Newsom v. Pryor's Lessee	7 (1822)	Marshall	none	none	C.C.D.W. Tenn.	affirmed
Tayloe v. Sandiford	13 (1822)	Marshall	none	none	C.C.D.C.	reversed
Taylor's Lessee v. Myers	23 (1822)	Marshall	none	none	C.C.D. Ohio	certification
Green v. Watkins	27 (1822)	Story	none	none	not indicated	affirmed
Page's Administrators v. Bank of Alexandria	35 (1822)	Livingston	none	none	C.C.D.C.	reversed
Ex parte Kearney	38 (1822)	Story	none	none	C.C.D.C.	habeas corpus denied
Bayley v. Greenleaf	46 (1822)	Marshall	none	none	C.C.D.C.	affirmed
Browder v. M'Arthur	58 (1822)	per curiam	none	none	not indicated	rehearing denied
Ricard v. Williams	59 (1822)	Story	none	none	C.C.D. Conn.	reversed
Bouldin v. Massie's Heirs	122 (1822)	Marshall	none	none	C.C.D. Ohio	affirmed
Watts v. Lindsey's Heirs	158 (1822)	Todd	none	none	C.C.D. Ohio	affirmed
Matthews v. Zane	164 (1822)	Marshall	none	none	Ohio	affirmed
Hoofnagle v. Anderson	212 (1822)	Marshall	none	none	C.C.D. Ohio	affirmed
Brown v. Jackson	218 (1822)	Livingston	none	none	C.C.S.D.N.Y.	affirmed
Blunt's Lessee v. Smith	248 (1822)	Marshall	none	none	C.C.D.W. Tenn.	affirmed
The Santissima Trinidad	283 (1822)	Story	none	none	C.C.D. Va.	affirmed
Evans v. Eaton	356 (1822)	Story	none	Livingston	C.C.D. Pa.	affirmed
Evans v. Hettich	453 (1822)	Story	none	none	C.C.D. Pa.	affirmed
The Gran Para	471 (1822)	Marshall	none	none	C.C.D. Md.	affirmed
The Santa Maria	490 (1822)	Livingston	none	none	C.C.D. Md.	affirmed
The Arrogante Barcelones	496 (1822)	Johnson	none	none	C.C.D. Md.	affirmed
The Monte Allegre	520 (1822)	Marshall	none	none	C.C.D. Md.	affirmed
Crocket v. Lee	522 (1822)	Marshall	none	none	C.C.D. Ky.	reversed
Macker's Heirs v. Thomas	530 (1822)	Washington	none	none	C.C.D. Ky.	reversed
Columbian Insurance Company v. Wheelright	534 (1822)	per curiam	none	none	C.C.D.C.	dismissed
Blight's Lessee v. Rochester	535 (1822)	Marshall	none	none	C.C.D. Ky.	affirmed
The Irresistible	551 (1822)	Marshall	none	none	C.C.D. Md.	affirmed
Holbrook v. Union Bank	553 (1822)	Marshall	none	none	C.C.D.C.	affirmed
Marbury v. Brooks	556 (1822)	Marshall	none	none	C.C.D.C.	reversed
Dorr v. Pacific Insurance Company	581 (1822)	Johnson	none	none	C.C.S.D.N.Y.	certiorari granted

== See also ==
- certificate of division
