= George Muter =

Chief Justice of the Kentucky Court of Appeals
- In office 1792–1806
- Preceded by: Harry Innes
- Succeeded by: Thomas Todd

Chief Justice of the District Court of Kentucky
- In office 1783–1792
- Preceded by: Cyrus Griffin
- Succeeded by: Court dissolved

Personal details
- Born: Madison County, Virginia
- Profession: Judge

Military service
- Rank: Colonel
- Battles/wars: Revolutionary War

George Muter was an early settler of Kentucky and served as chief justice of the Kentucky Court of Appeals.

== Early life and military career ==
Muter was born in Madison County, Virginia, then a part of Orange County. He was the son of a German father and a Scottish mother. Little is known of his early life.

During the Revolutionary War, Muter served as Virginia's Commissioner of the War Office. In March 1781, Friedrich Wilhelm von Steuben charged that Muter was responsible for inadequate availability of weapons and ammunition in the state. Muter learned of the charges before von Steuben brought them before the House of Burgesses and asked Governor Thomas Jefferson for a full investigation to clear his name. Jefferson expressed confidence in Muter, but the March 20 report of a special committee appointed by the House of Burgesses charged that Muter was not qualified to fill the position and ought to be removed from office. Muter resigned two days after the report was delivered. Thomas Speed also records that he was commander aboard a ship of war and attained the rank of colonel.

== Relocation to Kentucky ==
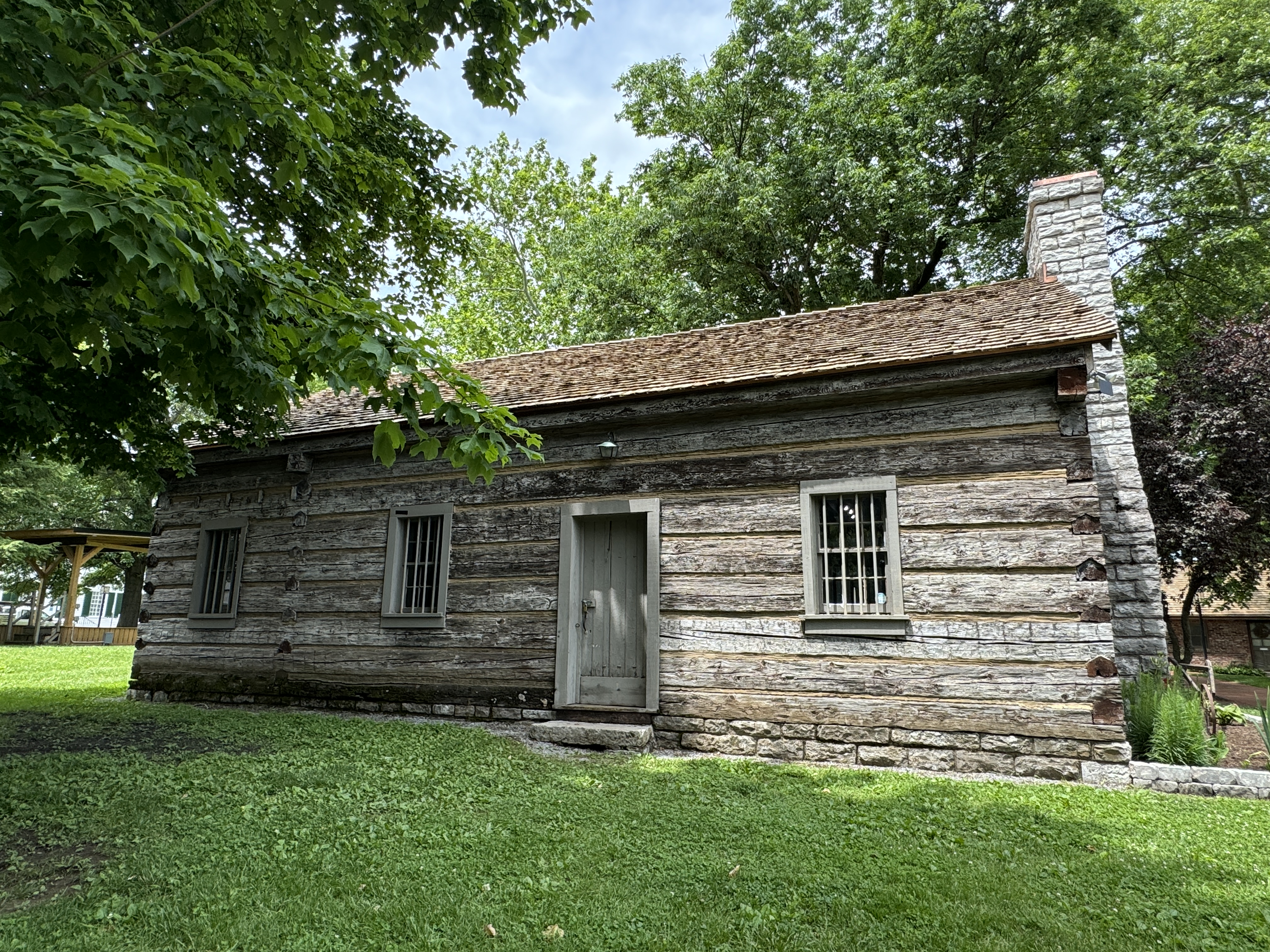
A replica of the first Kentucky state courthouse in Danville where Muter served as a judge

It is likely that Muter came to Kentucky in 1784. The Virginia legislature had appointed him to the district court of Kentucky in 1783, but did not assume the post until 1785. The court first convened in Harrodsburg, but was moved to Danville in 1783. On November 15, Muter succeeded Cyrus Griffin as chief justice of the court.

Muter was a member of the German Reformed Church in Lexington, Kentucky. He was also the first president of the Caledonian Society, a nod to his Scottish heritage on his mother's side. He was one of the first trustees of Transylvania Seminary, which would eventually merge with Kentucky University to become Transylvania University. He was also named a trustee of the city of Danville in 1787.

In 1786, Muter was invited to become a member of the Danville Political Club, a debating society that also included Samuel McDowell and Harry Innes. He was accepted as a member on the motion of John Belli on February 17, 1787; the vote was unanimous. An undated note in the club's records show that, even after Muter removed from Danville, the club retained him as a member.

From 1785 to 1792, Muter was a delegate to all ten conventions called for the purpose of framing the first Kentucky Constitution. In 1785, he and Harry Innes were chosen to carry a petition for statehood to the Virginia legislature.

When Kentucky achieved statehood in 1792, Muter was chosen as an elector to choose the state's governor and senators. The district court for Kentucky district was dissolved, and the Kentucky Court of Appeals was organized to replace it as the first court of last resort for the state. Muter's fellow district court judges, Caleb Wallace and Benjamin Sebastian, were immediately elevated to the court, but attorney general Harry Innes was elevated to chief justice instead of Muter. However, Innes was chosen by President George Washington as chief justice of the new U.S. district court for Kentucky; Innes immediately resigned to accept this position. The legislature chose Muter to replace Innes, who never presided over the court.

Muter presided over a meeting held in Lexington on May 24, 1794, for the purpose of addressing trade on the Mississippi River. The delegates to the meeting concluded that it was the duty of the United States Congress to secure free trade on the Mississippi from the Spanish, even if it meant the use of force.

In 1795, Muter and Sebastian rendered a decision against Kentucky pioneer Simon Kenton in a land title case. The decision was very unpopular with the people of Kentucky, and in December 1795, they petitioned the legislature to remove the two justices. The legislature failed to produce the two-thirds majority needed to remove the justices, but they were sternly rebuked. In May 1796, Muter joined with Caleb Wallace to express an opinion opposite his unpopular decision in October.

In 1806, Muter was pressured to retire from the bench, which he did on the condition that he would be paid a pension of three hundred dollars per year. The next legislature, however, repealed the pension. Governor Christopher Greenup, a past associate of Muter's, vetoed the repeal, but his veto was overridden. Because Muter had no family, his friend and fellow justice Thomas Todd invited Muter to live with him. In Muter's will, he left his entire estate to Todd.
