= SS Thomas Todd =

World War II Liberty ship of the United States

History

United States
- Name: Thomas Todd
- Namesake: Thomas Todd
- Owner: War Shipping Administration (WSA)
- Operator: Standard Fruit & Steamship Company
- Ordered: as type (EC2-S-C1) hull, MC hull 1492
- Builder: J.A. Jones Construction, Brunswick, Georgia
- Cost: $2,276,232
- Yard number: 108
- Way number: 4
- Laid down: 14 August 1942
- Launched: 19 May 1943
- Sponsored by: Mrs. G.N. McIlhenny
- Completed: 30 June 1943
- Identification: Call Signal: KIQL
- Fate: Laid up in National Defense Reserve Fleet, Hudson River Group, 12 June 1946; Sold for scrapping, 26 October 1970

General characteristics
- Class & type: Liberty ship; type EC2-S-C1, standard
- Tonnage: 10,865 LT DWT; 7,176 GRT
- Displacement: 3,380 long tons (3,434 t) (light); 14,245 long tons (14,474 t) (max)
- Length: 441 feet 6 inches (135 m) oa; 416 feet (127 m) pp; 427 feet (130 m) lwl
- Beam: 57 feet (17 m)
- Draft: 27 ft 9.25 in (8.4646 m)
- Installed power: 2 × Oil fired 450 °F (232 °C) boilers, operating at 220 psi (1,500 kPa); 2,500 hp (1,900 kW)
- Propulsion: 1 × triple-expansion steam engine, (manufactured by Harrisburg Machinery Corp., Harrisburg, Pennsylvania); 1 × screw propeller
- Speed: 11.5 knots (21.3 km/h; 13.2 mph)
- Capacity: 562,608 cubic feet (15,931 m^{3}) (grain); 499,573 cubic feet (14,146 m^{3}) (bale)
- Complement: 38–62 USMM; 21–40 USNAG
- Armament: Varied by ship; Bow-mounted 3-inch (76 mm)/50-caliber gun; Stern-mounted 4-inch (102 mm)/50-caliber gun; 2–8 × single 20-millimeter (0.79 in) Oerlikon anti-aircraft (AA) cannons and/or, 2–8 × 37-millimeter (1.46 in) M1 AA guns

SS Thomas Todd was a Liberty ship built in the United States during World War II. She was named after Thomas Todd, an Associate Justice of the Supreme Court of the United States.

== Construction ==
Thomas Todd was laid down on 14 August 1942, under a United States Maritime Commission (MARCOM) contract, MC hull 1492, by J.A. Jones Construction, Brunswick, Georgia; sponsored by Mrs. G.N. McIlhenny, and launched on 19 May 1943.

== History ==
She was allocated to Standard Fruit & Steamship Company, on 30 June 1943. On 12 June 1946, she was laid up in the National Defense Reserve Fleet in the Hudson River Group. On 13 August 1956, she was withdrawn from the fleet to be loaded with grain under the "Grain Program 1955", she returned loaded with grain on 4 September 1956. She was again withdrawn from the fleet on 4 June 1963, to have the grain unloaded, she returned empty on 10 June 1963. On 26 October 1970, she was sold, along with three other Liberty ships, to Industrial y Comercial Levante, S.A. for $346,000, for scrapping, she was delivered to Spain on 1 January 1971.

== Bibliography ==
- "Jones Construction, Brunswick GA". ShipbuildingHistory.com. 13 October 2010.
- "Liberty Ships – World War II".
- Maritime Administration. "Thomas Todd". Ship History Database Vessel Status Card. U.S. Department of Transportation, Maritime Administration. Archived from the original on 12 December 2019.
- Davies, James (May 2004). "Specifications (As-Built)" (PDF). p. 23.
- "SS Thomas Todd".
