= Evans v. Eaton (1822) =

- Supreme Court of the United States

Argued March 4, 1822 Decided March 20, 1822
- Full case name: Oliver Evans v. Eaton
- Citations: 20 U.S. 356 (more) 7 Wheat. 356, 5 L. Ed. 472; 1822 U.S. LEXIS 266

Case history
- Prior: Writ of error from District of Pennsylvania, where case had been remanded following previous Supreme Court case overturning the original district court judgment.
- Subsequent: None

Holding
- A patent on an improved machine must clearly set forth how the invention differs from the prior art.

Court membership
- Chief Justice John Marshall Associate Justices Bushrod Washington · William Johnson; H. Brockholst Livingston · Thomas Todd; Gabriel Duvall · Joseph Story

Case opinions
- Majority: Story, joined by Marshall, Washington, Todd
- Dissent: Livingstone, joined by Johnson, Duvall

Laws applied
- Patent Act of 1793, An Act for the Relief of Oliver Evans)

Evans v. Eaton, 20 U.S. (7 Wheat.) 356 (1822), was a United States Supreme Court case in which the Court held, chiefly, that a patent on an improved machine must clearly describe how the machine differs from the prior art.

It was the fourth published Supreme Court decision on patents, and the second to deal with substantive patent law. It was also the third of four successive Supreme Court cases related specifically to the Oliver Evans flour mill patent.

== Background ==
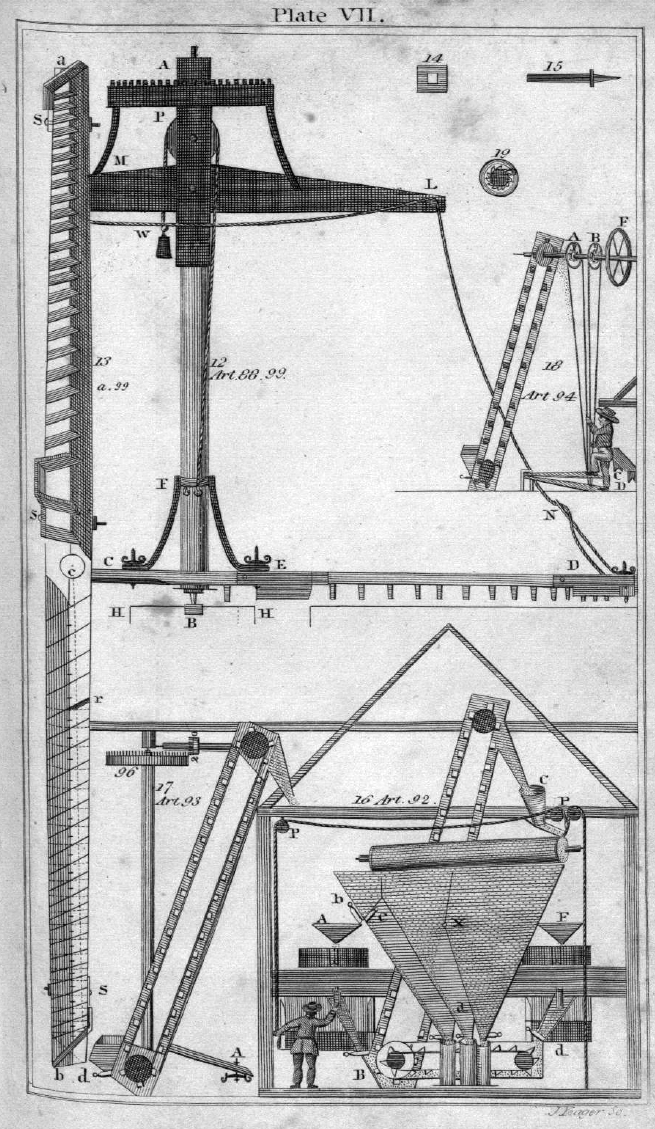
Evans' hopperboy and automated bolting process.

In the 1780s, inventor Oliver Evans developed a system for an automated flour mill that would revolutionize milling technology. After keeping his invention a secret while he reduced it to practice, he initially obtained protection for it through individual state statutes, for example in Maryland and New Hampshire, because the patent system did not yet exist. When the Patent Act of 1790 took effect, Evans obtained the third United States patent ever issued. No copies of this original patent are extant.

As all patents at the time had 14-year terms, his patent lapsed in 1804, and the invention entered the public domain. Immediately upon the expiration of his patent, he sought a private bill that would allow him to renew it, the first such request ever made. He was unsuccessful until 1808, when the Tenth Congress passed a law authorizing the Secretary of State to grant him a new patent on the same terms as the original one. Evans obtained his new patent the day after the law took effect.

Under the Patent Act of 1793, which was in effect at the time of the 1808 grant, patents were not required to have claims. In the case of complex patent such as Evans', which included both a general improved method of manufacturing flour and specific improved machines for achieving that method, this created confusion as to the actual scope of grant. By the same token, it also created confusion as to the kind of prior art that would suffice to invalidate the patent on the basis of anticipation.

In the district court for Pennsylvania, the defendant Eaton did not dispute having used Evans' improved hopperboy, but sought to show either that the patent only covered the improved method as a whole (and not the hopperboy specifically), or alternatively that the patent had been anticipated by earlier machines. In particular, the defendant introduced evidence of a crude kind of hopperboy that was in use at some mills in Pennsylvania in the 1760s. Persuaded that the patent could only cover the improved method as a whole, rather than any of the improved machines, the court instructed the jury in such a way that the jurors had no choice but to return a verdict for the defendant, as they did. The court also declined to admit the plaintiff's proffered evidence that the defendant had initially offered to pay a license fee to Evans.

The case was then appealed to the Supreme Court on a writ of error, and then remanded to the district court after a determination that the patent was not valid unless it was distinct from the prior art. On retrial, the district court found that the patent was invalid, on two grounds: (1) that if the patent was on the hopperboy as such, it was anticipated because there had been other hopperboys in use before Evans' invention; and (2) that if the patent was on Evans' improvements to the hopperboy, it was invalid for lack of written description, because the patent did not clearly set forth the ways in which Evans' hopperboy differed from hopperboys of the prior art.

Evans then appealed once again to the Supreme Court. Two of Evans' objections were procedural: that evidence was admitted from the testimony of a miller who stood to benefit from the patent being declared invalid, and that the trial court had unjustly excluded a deposition taken according to established state procedure rather than federal procedure. The others were more substantive: that the trial court erred in telling the jury that if the patent was on the hopperboy as such, it would be invalidated by any use of a hopperboy operating on the same principle as Evans' hopperboy; and that the trial court erred in ruling that if the patent was only on the improvements to the hopperboy, the patent was invalid for failing to describe precisely what the improvements were.

Evans died two years before the Supreme Court ruled on this second appeal; his factory had been destroyed by fire in 1819.

== Opinion of the Court ==
Writing for the four-justice majority, Justice Story rejected each of Evans' appeals:

1. The trial court's admission of the miller's testimony was acceptable, because the miller did not have a direct interest in the outcome of the specific case, and excluding everyone who had even a general interest in the subject matter of a patent case would effectively exclude everyone in the industry.
2. The trial court's exclusion of the deposition was proper because no amount of established local practice could overturn federal procedural rules.
3. The trial court properly left the question of whether the Evans hopperboy was anticipated by the prior art to the jury.
4. The trial court properly ruled that if the Evans patent was only on the improvement to the hopperboy, it was void as a matter of law because the patent did not set forth how the invention differed from the hopperboys of the prior art.

== Dissent ==
Three justices dissented: Johnson, Livingston, and Duvall. The recorded dissenting opinion was however authored by Justice Livingston alone. Livingston took particular issue with the Supreme Court's willingness to accept English precedents on patent law despite the growing differences between the British and American patent systems.

Skipping over Evans' procedural objections, Justice Livingston dissented on three points:

1. He contended that the specification of the Evans patent was not defective in the first place, because it provided sufficient information to "distinguish [the invention] from all other things before known", as required by the Patent Act of 1793, section 11. Even though the specification did not elaborate on the distinctions between the invention and the prior art, any person of ordinary skill in the art would be able to see how it differed from previous hopperboys, and would be on notice of what kind of hopperboy would infringe the patent.
2. He contended that a patent should not be entirely invalidated merely because its claims are overbroad. Although there were English precedents for such an action, the American law did not require it, and there was no basis for imposing such a "very high penalty" when the patent had been filed in good faith without any intention to over-claim.
3. Even if such a penalty was proper, Livingston argued, it was based on a question of fact and should be assessed only by a jury.

== Subsequent developments ==
The case was the culmination of a long series of previous decisions holding that an invention had not only to set forth how to implement the invention, but also how the invention differed from the prior art. This doctrine ultimately gave rise to the requirement for separate, distinct claims, as adopted in the Patent Act of 1836. It also gave rise to the written description requirement as distinct from the enablement requirement. However, in modern jurisprudence the written description requirement did not re-emerge as a distinct issue until the passage of the Patent Act of 1952. It first entered modern jurisprudence as a distinct requirement when the Court of Customs and Patent Appeals issued its In re Ruschig decision in 1965. This historical connection notwithstanding, authorities including Judge Rader have argued that Evans v. Eaton in fact supports considering enablement and written description as a single requirement, because the need for distinction from the prior art was addressed by the requirement for a separate claims section.

The case has also been noted as an early antecedent to the modern doctrine of obviousness, and the doctrine of equivalents.

Because the case is specific to the state of patent law before 1836, it has seldom been cited since the mid-19th century. The most recent citation in a Supreme Court case is in the 1906 case of Burton v. United States, in which the case was cited as authority for the admissibility of testimony from witnesses with a general interest in the outcome of a case. Before that, it was cited in Phoenix Mut. Life Ins. Co. v. Raddin in 1887, as an early example of the court's objections to including unnecessarily lengthy quotations in the text of an appeal. It was also sometimes cited in cases over land patents, regarding the necessity for any grant to be clearly distinguished from other grants, for example in the 1837 case of Proprietors of Charles River Bridge v. Proprietors of Warren Bridge.

== Works cited ==
- Federico, P.J. (1945). "The Patent Trials of Oliver Evans - Part I". Journal of the Patent Office Society. 27: 586.
- Federico, P.J. (1945). "The Patent Trials of Oliver Evans - Part II". Journal of the Patent Office Society. 27: 657.
