= Transfer (patent) =

Patent law concept

As objects of intellectual property or intangible assets, patents and patent applications may be transferred. A transfer of patent or patent application can be the result of a financial transaction, such as an assignment, a merger, a takeover or a demerger, or the result of an operation of law, such as in an inheritance process, or in a bankruptcy.

== Rationale ==
The rationale behind the transferability of patents and patent applications is that it enables inventors to sell their rights and to let other people manage these intellectual property assets both on the valuation and enforcement fronts. As The Economist put it,

"Patents are transferable assets, and by the early 20th century they had made it possible to separate the person who makes an invention from the one who commercialises it. This recognised the fact that someone who is good at coming up with ideas is not necessarily the best person to bring those ideas to market."

== United States ==
In the United States, assignment of a patent is governed by statute. Assignment of an interest occurs only by an "instrument in writing". The statute also permits recording an assignment with the United States Patent and Trademark Office, but recording is not required except to protect against "any subsequent purchaser or mortgagee for a valuable consideration, without notice....".

== Security agreement ==
A security agreement is a conditional transfer of patent ownership when patents are used as collateral for a loan. The borrower will agree to transfer ownership of the patents to the lender if the borrow defaults on the loan. Security agreements on patents in the US are registered with the United States Patent and Trademark Office.

== See also ==
- Assignor estoppel
