= Evans v. Eaton (1818) =

- Supreme Court of the United States

Argued February 26, 1818 Decided March 7, 1818
- Full case name: Evans v. Eaton
- Citations: 16 U.S. 454 (more) 3 Wheat. 454; 4 L. Ed. 433

Case history
- Prior: Writ of error from the District of Pennsylvania
- Subsequent: Retried in the District of Pennsylvania, then appealed to Supreme Court.

Court membership
- Chief Justice John Marshall Associate Justices Bushrod Washington · William Johnson; H. Brockholst Livingston · Thomas Todd; Gabriel Duvall · Joseph Story

Case opinion
- Majority: Marshall, joined by unanimous

Laws applied
- Patent Act of 1793, An Act for the Relief of Oliver Evans)

Evans v. Eaton, 16 U.S. (3 Wheat.) 454 (1818), was a United States Supreme Court case in which the Court held that a patent disclosing an improved method of manufacture by means of several different improved machines should be construed to claim both the method and the improvements to the machines, but not to include the machines apart from the inventor's improvements.

It was the third published Supreme Court decision on patents, and the first to deal with substantive patent law. It was the first Supreme Court case to deal with the question of when an invention is patentably distinct from the prior art. It was also the second of four successive Supreme Court cases related specifically to the Oliver Evans flour mill patent.

In addition to its legal significance, the opinion is notable for containing in its appendix a transcript of the Evans patent and patent application, otherwise unavailable to the modern reader.

== Background ==
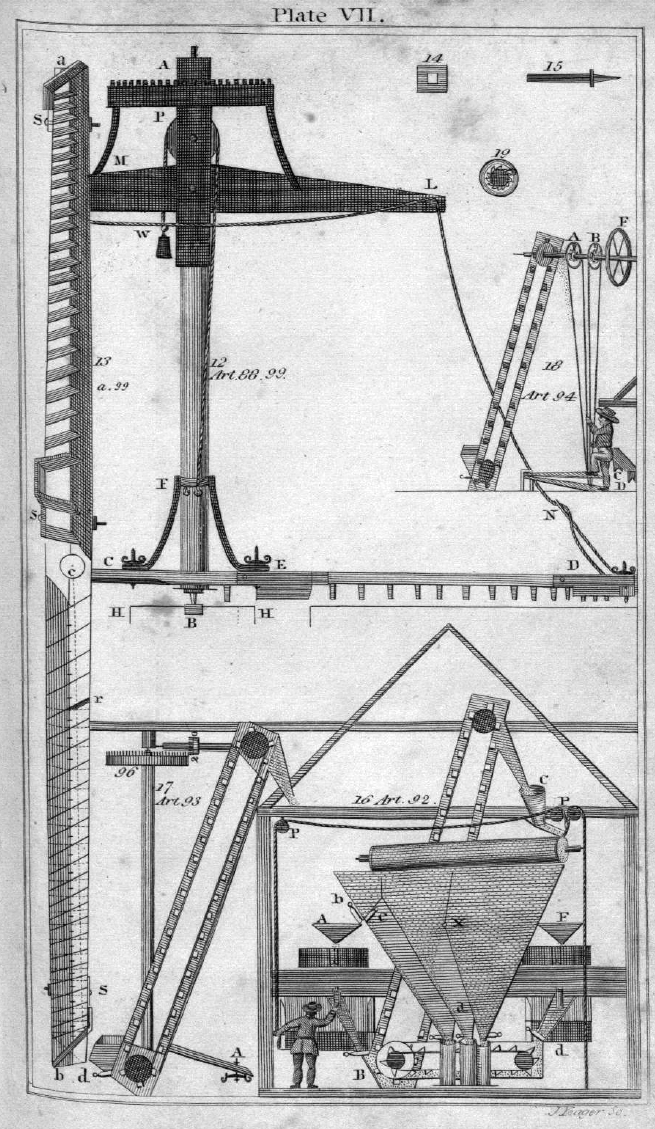
Evans' hopperboy and automated bolting process.

In the 1780s, inventor Oliver Evans developed a system for an automated flour mill that would revolutionize milling technology. After keeping his invention a secret while he reduced it to practice, he initially obtained protection for it through individual state statutes, for example in Maryland and New Hampshire, because the patent system did not yet exist. When the Patent Act of 1790 took effect, Evans obtained the third United States patent ever issued. No copies of this original patent are extant.

As all patents at the time had 14-year terms, his patent lapsed in 1804, and the invention entered the public domain. Immediately upon the expiration of his patent, he sought a private bill that would allow him to renew it, the first such request ever made. He was unsuccessful until 1808, when the Tenth Congress passed a law authorizing the Secretary of State to grant him a new patent on the same terms as the original one. Evans obtained his new patent the day after the law took effect.

Under the Patent Act of 1793, which was in effect at the time of the 1808 grant, patents were not required to have claims. In the case of complex patent such as Evans', which included both a general improved method of manufacturing flour and specific improved machines for achieving that method, this created confusion as to the actual scope of grant. By the same token, it also created confusion as to the kind of prior art that would suffice to invalidate the patent on the basis of anticipation.

In the district court for Pennsylvania, the defendant Eaton did not dispute having used Evans' improved hopperboy, but sought to show either that the patent only covered the improved method as a whole (and not the hopperboy specifically), or alternatively that the patent had been anticipated by earlier machines. In particular, the defendant introduced evidence of a crude kind of hopperboy that was in use at some mills in Pennsylvania in the 1760s. Persuaded that the patent could only cover the improved method as a whole, rather than any of the improved machines, the court instructed the jury in such a way that the jurors had no choice but to return a verdict for the defendant, as they did. The court also declined to admit the plaintiff's proffered evidence that the defendant had initially offered to pay a license fee to Evans.

The case was then appealed to the Supreme Court on a writ of error, with Evans alleging the following errors:

1. That the district court should have admitted the plaintiff's evidence that the defendant's witnesses had paid the license fee, thus implicitly conceding the validity of the patent;
2. That the district court should not have admitted evidence of the use of the hopperboy in other locations not specified in the defendant's pleading;
3. That the district court should not have instructed the jury that Evans was not entitled to damages for infringement unless he was the original inventor of the hopperboy.

== Opinion of the Court ==
The Court unanimously rejected the district court's judgment, and remanded the case for a new trial under a venire facias de novo. The opinion was authored by Chief Justice Marshall.

The Court accepted the first ground of error and rejected the second, in both cases preferring to put the evidence before the jury. The Court noted however that the evidence of witnesses having paid the license fee was entitled to "very little weight."

On the main issue, regarding the district court's instructions to the jury, the Court agreed that the district court had erred in two respects: first, in opining that the patent covered only the improvement in manufacture "produced by the general combination of all his machinery", and not the individual machines used; and second, in instructing the jury that Evans could not recover unless he was the original inventor of the hopperboy rather than an improver. Fatefully, however, the Court observed that

In all cases where his claim is for an improvement on a machine, it will be encumbent on him to show the extent of his improvement, so that a person understanding the subject may comprehend distinctly in what it consists.

== Subsequent developments ==
The case was retried in the district court of Pennsylvania, with the jury once again returning a verdict for the defendant. The verdict turned on the judge's instruction that the jury should not find for the plaintiff unless there was clear evidence within the patent (including the annexed schedule and application) as to the exact nature of Evans' improvements on the prior art. Since the patent had not been drafted with such a requirement in mind, and merely described his invention without distinguishing it from the prior art, there was essentially no question left for the jury to decide. The next year, Evans published a pamphlet arguing his side of the case, with particular attention to the court rejecting his evidence on novel grounds. He also once again appealed to the Supreme Court on a writ of error, but his appeal was rejected by a closely divided Court in Evans v. Eaton (1822)—although by that time, he was dead and the patent had expired.

The confusion arising about the scope of the claimed invention in this case led in part to the Patent Act of 1836, which introduced the requirement of a separate claims section for all patents. That requirement in turn made the specific legal analysis in this case largely obsolete. However, the case continued to be cited for the general principle that a patentee need not be aware of a previous use in order for that previous use to render the patent invalid.

The case was most recently cited by the Supreme Court in 1934, to support the general principle that "the prize of an exclusive patent falls to the one who had the fortune to be first."

== Works cited ==
- Federico, P.J. (1945). "The Patent Trials of Oliver Evans - Part I". Journal of the Patent Office Society. 27: 586.
- Federico, P.J. (1945). "The Patent Trials of Oliver Evans - Part II". Journal of the Patent Office Society. 27: 657.
