= Thomas Todd =

US Supreme Court justice from 1807 to 1826

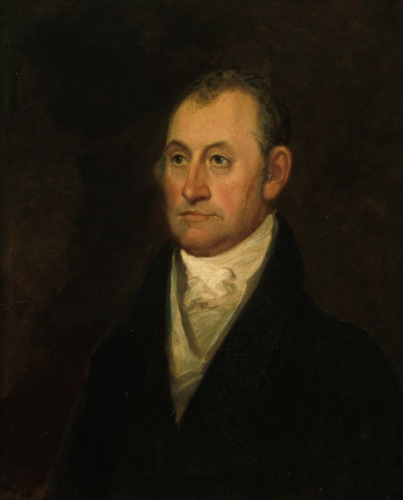

Associate Justice of the Supreme Court of the United States
- In office May 4, 1807 – February 7, 1826
- Nominated by: Thomas Jefferson
- Preceded by: Seat established
- Succeeded by: Robert Trimble

Chief Justice of the Kentucky Court of Appeals
- In office December 13, 1806 – March 3, 1807
- Preceded by: George Muter
- Succeeded by: Felix Grundy

Associate Justice of the Kentucky Court of Appeals
- In office December 19, 1801 – December 13, 1806
- Preceded by: Seat established
- Succeeded by: Robert Trimble

Member of the Virginia House of Delegates for Lincoln County
- In office October 17, 1791 – December 20, 1791 Serving with John Logan
- Preceded by: Baker Ewing
- Succeeded by: position abolished

Personal details
- Born: January 23, 1765 King and Queen County, Virginia, British America
- Died: February 7, 1826 (aged 61) Frankfort, Kentucky, U.S.
- Resting place: Frankfort Cemetery
- Party: Democratic-Republican
- Spouse(s): Elizabeth Harris; Lucy Payne (1812–1826)
- Education: Liberty Hall Academy

Military service
- Allegiance: United Colonies of North America
- Branch/service: Continental Army
- Years of service: 1781
- Rank: Private
- Unit: Virginia Militia

Thomas Todd (January 23, 1765 – February 7, 1826) was an Associate Justice of the Supreme Court of the United States from 1807 to 1826. Raised in the Colony of Virginia, he briefly served in the American Revolutionary War before completing his education and moving westward, where he participated in the founding of Kentucky. There he practiced law as well as served as a clerk and judge, before becoming a Supreme Court justice. He married twice and had a total of eight children. Todd joined the U.S. Supreme Court in 1807 and his handful of legal opinions there mostly concerned land claims. He was labeled the most insignificant U.S. Supreme Court justice by Frank H. Easterbrook in The Most Insignificant Justice: Further Evidence, 50 U. Chi. L. Rev. 481 (1983).

== Early and family life ==
Todd was born to the former Elizabeth Richards and her husband, Richard Todd in King and Queen County, Virginia, on January 23, 1765. He was the youngest of five children, all orphaned when Thomas was a boy.

His ancestors had emigrated to the Virginia and Maryland colonies a century earlier, and many were sea captains, merchants and planters. Although Captain Thomas Todd (1619-1675/75) initially of County Durham in England kept his main residence, called "Toddsbury" in Gloucester County in the Virginia colony (on a peninsula that became Mathews County), he also claimed land in Baltimore County, Maryland in 1657 based on people he had helped migrate to the Maryland Colony. That early Capt. Thomas Todd married Anne Gorsuch (of Hertfordshire in England) whose brother Richard Gorsuch had also patented land in Baltimore County. Though that Thomas Todd ultimately died in England, their son, also Thomas Todd, inherited land in both counties and like his father held local offices, including justice of the peace. Thomas Todd Jr. married Elizabeth Bernard, who is now considered of the First Families of Virginia because her father William Bernard (1603–1665) served on the Colony's Governor's Council 1641-1665 and married the widow of Lewis Burwell who after his death married powerful planter and merchant Philip Ludwell and many descendants became burgesses and held other high offices in the colony. While Todd daughters married sons of burgesses, the first men of the family to attain burgess rank were Capt. John Baylor (whose merchant burgess father John Baylor had married Lucy Todd) and Robert Todd of Norfolk, both of whom served in the mid-1750s and died shortly before the American Revolutionary War. This man's father, Richard Todd (d. 1766) was raised in King and Queen County (slightly northwest of Gloucester County on Virginia's Middle Neck) and moved his family (including a son, this man's older brother and also named Richard Todd) to Chesterfield County (which included Manchester now a part of the city of Richmond) when this man was a boy. There the senior Richard Todd died in 1766. The younger Richard Todd (and later this boy) moved to Lincoln County, Kentucky after the American Revolutionary War.

=== Military ===
In 1781, the 16 year old, Todd joined the Continental Army as a private with a cavalry company from Manchester, and thus participated in the final months of the American Revolutionary War. After only six months of battle experience as the Siege of Yorktown ended, he returned home, then traveled westmard to Lexington where he enrolled in Liberty Hall Academy (now Washington and Lee University) and graduated in 1783.

=== Education, tutoring and move to Kentucky ===
This Thomas Todd was raised Presbyterian, but because Virginia lacked public schools at the time, had difficulty obtaining an education. After his military service, Todd moved westward to Lexington where he became a tutor at Liberty Hall Academy (which later became Washington & Lee University) as well as a student. He graduated at age 18, in 1783.

Todd then continued his westward move, by taking a tutoring job with the family of his cousin, Judge Harry Innes in Bedford County, Virginia. Todd also studied surveying before moving to Kentucky County (then part of Virginia) with the Innes family when Harry Innes was appointed a judge of the United States District Court for the District of Kentucky. Todd tutored his cousin's children in Danville, Kentucky in exchange for help in reading law.

== Kentucky lawyer, clerk and judge ==
Todd was admitted to the Kentucky bar in 1786, and from 1788 until 1801 maintained a private practice in Danville (the Lincoln County seat and during this man's lifetime the first capital of Kentucky, although now the county seat of Boyle County, formed in 1842 long after this man's death). Todd also gained influence by becoming its court reporter and served as secretary to the Kentucky State Legislature after statehood. Before that event, Todd served as the secretary to ten conventions between 1784 and 1792 which advocated formation of the state of Kentucky, and which later wrote its state constitution. Todd also served as one of Lincoln County's two delegates to the Virginia House of Delegates in the term which ended in Kentucky's statehood. Politically, Todd was a Jeffersonian. He was an unsuccessful candidate for governor of Kentucky in 1795 and 1800.

Todd became also the first clerk of the Kentucky Court of Appeals. In 1801, legislators elected him as a judge of that court, and fellow judges in 1806 elected him as the chief judge). Todd also owned slaves, twenty-six slaves at the time of the 1820 census.

== Supreme Court justice ==
On February 28, 1807, President Thomas Jefferson nominated Todd as an associate justice of the Supreme Court, after the number of seats on the Court was expanded from six to seven by Congress. The United States Senate confirmed the appointment on March 2, 1807, and Todd was sworn into office on May 4, 1807.

Todd served under Chief Justice John Marshall. As the justice responsible for the circuit including Kentucky, Tennessee and Ohio, Todd convened court twice a year each in Nashville, Frankfort and Chillicothe, and spent the six winter months in Washington, D.C.

He is one of 19 Presbyterians to have served on the Court. He served on the Court until his death on February 7, 1826.

=== Court opinions ===
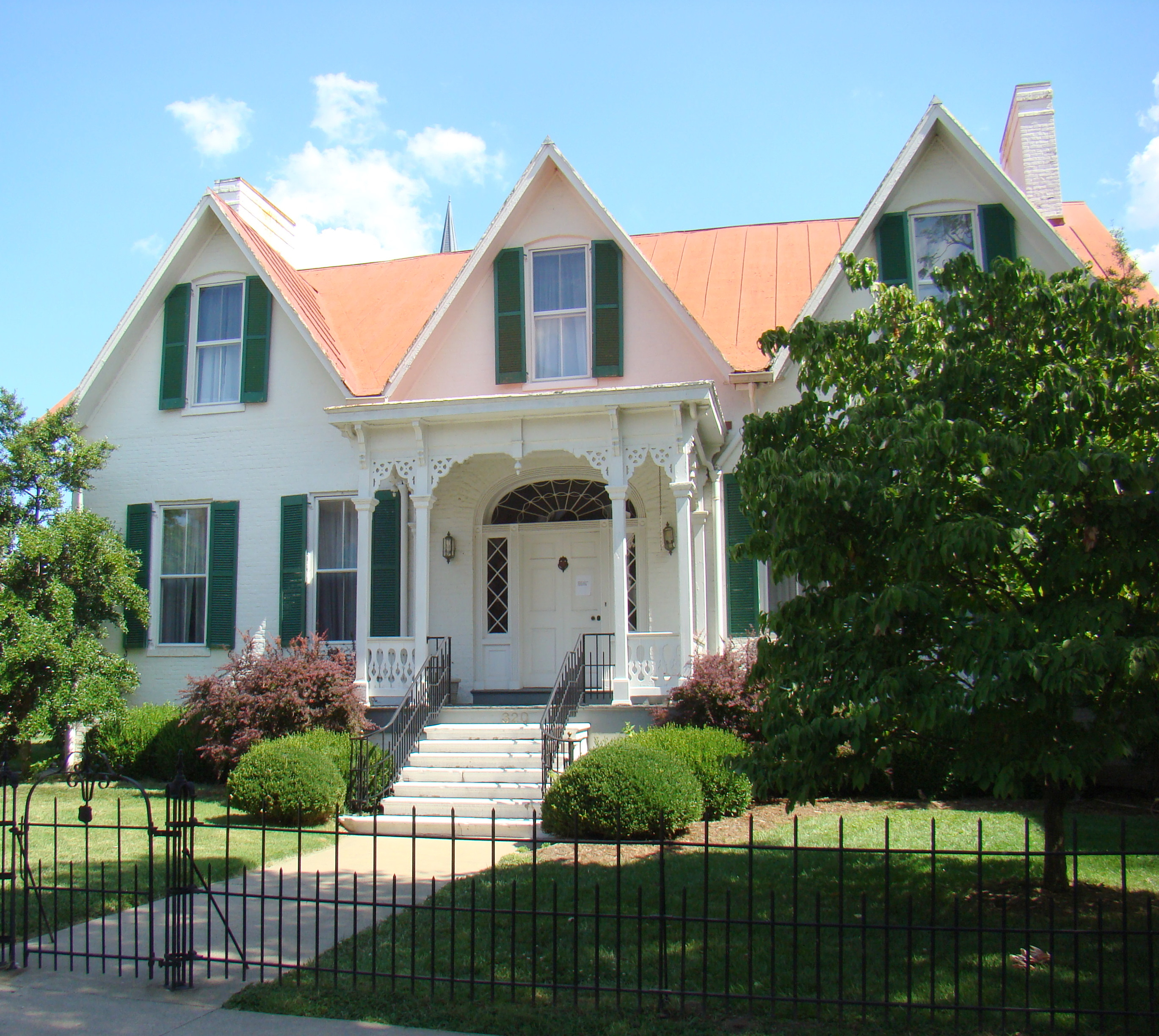
Thomas Todd House Frankfort, Kentucky

Although they had different political beliefs, Todd adopted Marshall's views on judicial interpretation, but did not write a single constitutional opinion. Todd wrote only fourteen opinions—eleven majority, two concurring and one dissenting. Ten of his eleven majority opinions involved disputed land and survey claims.

Todd's first reported opinion was a dissent to the opinion of Chief Justice Marshall in Finley v. Lynn. He concurred in all other opinions written by the chief justice. One of the more interesting of these cases was Preston v. Browder, in which the court upheld the right of North Carolina to make land claim restrictions on filings that were made in Indian Territory and that violated the Treaty of the Long Island of Holston made by the state on July 20, 1777. His opinion in Watts v. Lindsey's Heirs et al., explained confusing and complicated land title problems which plagued early settlers of Kentucky.

Todd's only Court opinion that did not involve land law was his last. In Riggs v. Taylor, the court made the important procedural ruling, now taken for granted, that if a party intends to use a document as evidence, then the original must be produced. However, if the original is in the possession of the other party to the suit, and that party refuses to produce it, or if the original is lost or destroyed, then secondary evidence will be admitted.

== Personal life ==
Todd married twice, although genealogists disagree as to some of his offspring. He first married Elizabeth Harris in 1788. Before she died in 1811, the couple had five children, of whom the first, Harry Innes Todd, died as an infant. Of the surviving sons, Charles Stewart Todd (1791–1871) continued the family's legal, military and public service traditions, and his brother John Harris Todd (1795–1824) also became a lawyer, and his widow would remarry John J. Crittenden (who had already served once as Kentucky's U.S. Senator and who would later again serve as such, as well as Kentucky Governor, U.S. congressman and attorney general). This man's daughters, Ann Maria (1801–1862) and Elizabeth Frances (1808–1892) ultimately married prominent lawyers.

On March 29, 1812, after more than a year of mourning his first wife, Todd married Lucy Payne Washington (1776–1846), a younger sister of Dolley Madison and the widow of Major George Steptoe Washington, who was a nephew of President George Washington. Theirs appears to have been the first wedding held in the White House. Genealogists agree that their son James Madison Todd (1817–1897) survived and married, and that their daughter was named Madisonia, but disagree as to whether the other son was named William J. or Thomas Johnston Todd.

== Death, estate and legacy ==
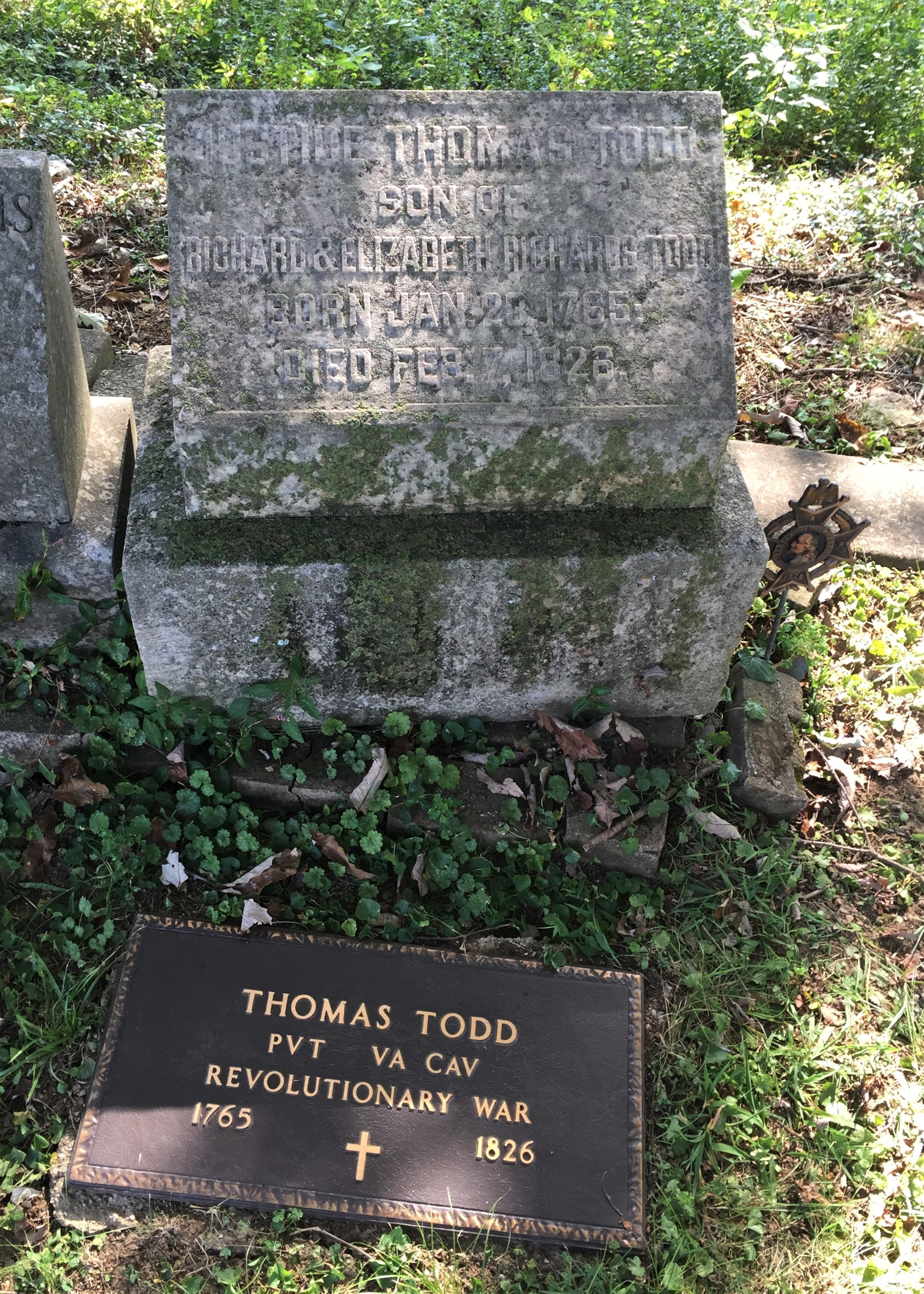
Thomas Todd gravesite, Frankfort Cemetery Frankfort, Kentucky

Todd died in Frankfort, Kentucky on February 7, 1826, at the age of 61. He was initially buried in the Innes family cemetery. Later, his remains were removed to Frankfort Cemetery, overlooking the Kentucky River and the Kentucky State Capitol.

At the time of his death, Todd owned substantial real property, particularly in Frankfort. He was a charter member of the Kentucky River Company, the first business formed to promote Kentucky waterway navigation. The inventory of his estate revealed he was a shareholder of the Kentucky Turnpike, the first publicly improved highway west of the Alleghenies, and the Frankfort toll bridge, crossing the Kentucky River. In addition to his home, he owned more than 7,200 acres (29 km^{2}) of land throughout the state and another twenty or so pieces in Frankfort. After his children were provided for, as he put it, in "their full proportion", the remainder of his estate valued at more than $70,000—a large sum at the time.

Todd's papers are kept in three locations:

- Cincinnati Historical Society, Cincinnati, Ohio.
- The Filson Historical Society, Louisville, Kentucky.
- University of Kentucky, Margaret I. King Library, Lexington, Kentucky.

During World War II the Liberty ship SS Thomas Todd was built in Brunswick, Georgia, and named in his honor.

== Memberships and other honors ==
Todd became a member of the American Antiquarian Society in 1820. He was also a Freemason.

== See also ==
- List of justices of the Supreme Court of the United States
- Marshall Court
- United States Supreme Court cases during the Marshall Court

== Sources ==
- Oyez Project, Supreme Court Media, Thomas Todd
- The Adherents, Religious Affiliation of Supreme Court Justices.
- https://www.law.cornell.edu/supct/justices/histbio.html#todd
- Biography and Bibliography, Thomas Todd, 6th Circuit United States Court of Appeals.

Legal offices
New seat	Associate Justice of the Kentucky Court of Appeals; 1801–1807	Succeeded by Robert Trimble
Preceded by George Muter	Chief Justice of the Kentucky Court of Appeals; 1806–1807	Succeeded by Felix Grundy
New seat	Associate Justice of the Supreme Court of the United States; 1807–1826	Succeeded by Robert Trimble
