= Weeping Angel (disambiguation) =

Weeping Angels are a race of predatory creatures in the Doctor Who television series.

Weeping Angel may also refer to:

- Weeping Angel, an alternate title for the 1894 sculpture Angel of Grief by William Wetmore Story
- Weeping Angel, a hacking tool co-developed by the CIA and MI5, and documented in the Wikileaks Vault 7 series of documents
