= Julian Russell Story =

American painter (1857–1919)

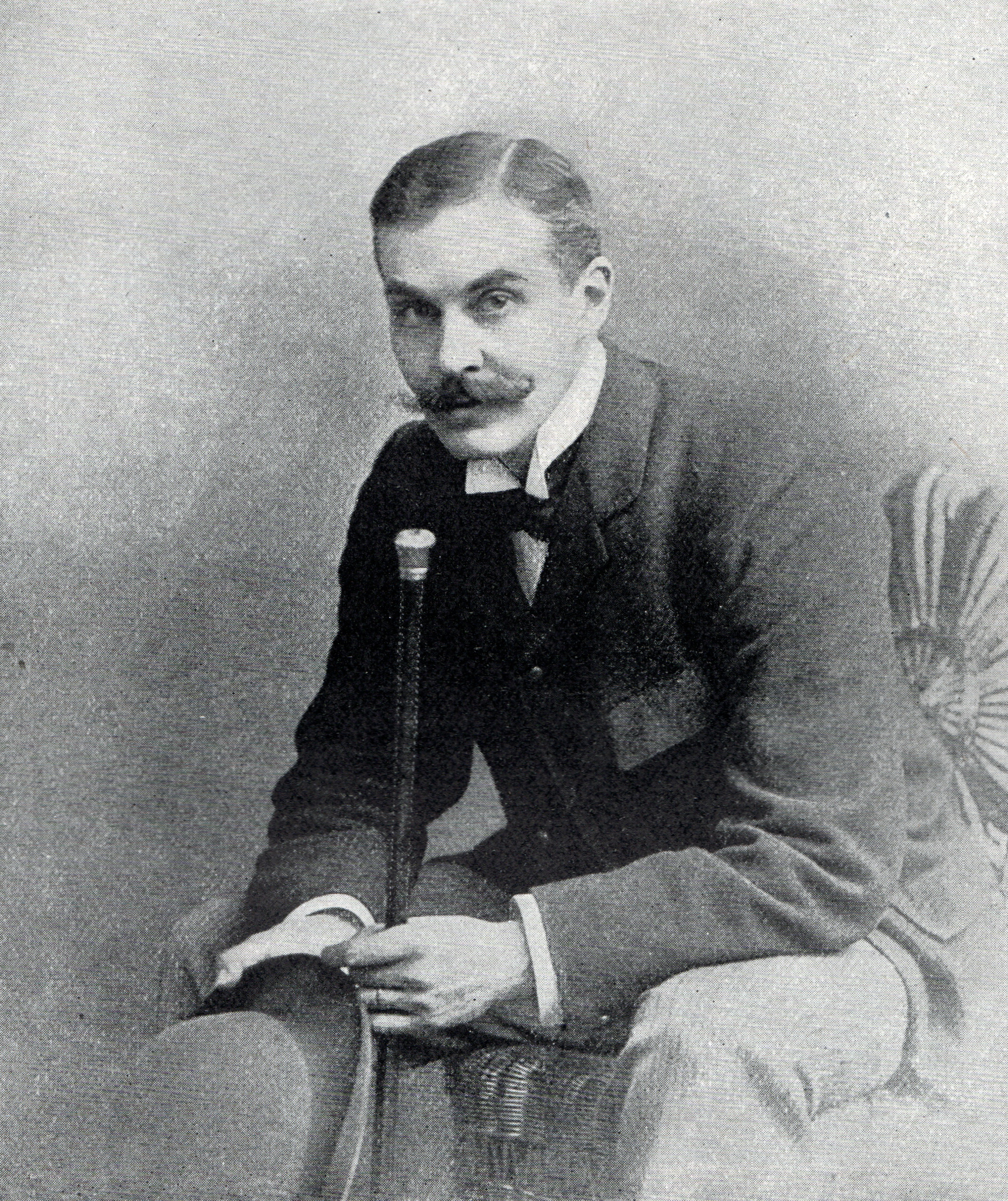
- Born: September 8, 1857; Walton-on-Thames, Surrey, England
- Died: February 24, 1919 (aged 61); Philadelphia, Pennsylvania
- Known for: Painting
- Spouses: Emma Eames (m. 1891; div. 1907) Elaine Sartori Bohlen (m. 1909)

Julian Russell Story (September 8, 1857 – February 24, 1919) was an American painter.

== Early life ==
Story was born on September 8, 1857, in Walton-on-Thames, Surrey, to American parents. He was the youngest child of sculptor William Wetmore Story and Emelyn (née Eldredge) Story. Among his siblings was brother Thomas Waldo Story, also a well known sculptor, and sister, Edith Marion (née Story), Marchesa Peruzzi di Medici, the wife of Marquess Simone Peruzzi di Medici. During his stays in Rome, he became close with the Italian painter Antonio Mancini, who painted him twice. Today, one of those portraits is in the Lukas Charles Collection

He was educated at Eton and Brasenose College, Oxford University, England.

== Personal life ==
In 1891, Story was married to the renowned American soprano Emma Eames, the daughter of an international lawyer. Eames was born in Shanghai, China, and raised in Portland and Bath, Maine. They divorced in 1907 and Emma later married Emilio de Gogorza.

In 1909, he married Elaine Sartori Bohlen, the daughter of Victor Alexander Sartori and Annie Lawrence Gordon. Together, they were the parents of:

- Emelyn McClellan Florence Story (1912–1946), who married Edward Maynard Ewer, in 1931.
- Vera Felicity Story (1918–2001), who married Henry Latrobe Roosevelt Jr., a son of Assistant Secretary of the Navy Henry L. Roosevelt, in 1937.

He died in Philadelphia at age 61. He was buried at Chelten Hills Cemetery in Philadelphia.

== Artworks ==
Artworks of Julian Russel Story
Name of the art	Date	Artist's age	Dimensions	Location	Art
The Black Prince at the Battle of Crecy	1888	Approximately 31	128 in. x 197 in.	Telfair Museum of Art	
Louisa Dowager Viscountess Wolseley	1884	Approximately 27	Unknown	Victoria and Albert Museum - London (United Kingdom)	
Portrait of Count Louis Vorow Zborowski with His Dog	1898	Unknown	Unknown	Private collection	
Portrait of Mrs. Frederick Sharon	1901	Approximately 44	Height: 80.01 cm (31.5 in.) Width: 61.28 cm (24.13 in.)	Private collection	
Sculptor Alphonse-Amédée Cordonnier	Unknown	Unknown	Unknown	Palais des Beaux Arts de Lille (France)	
Portrait of Ernest W. Longfellow	1892	Unknown	55.88 x 45.72 cm (22 x 18 in.)	Museum of Fine Arts Boston	

== See also ==
- List of painters by name
- Lists of painters by nationality
