= William Wetmore Story =

American sculptor, art critic, poet, and editor

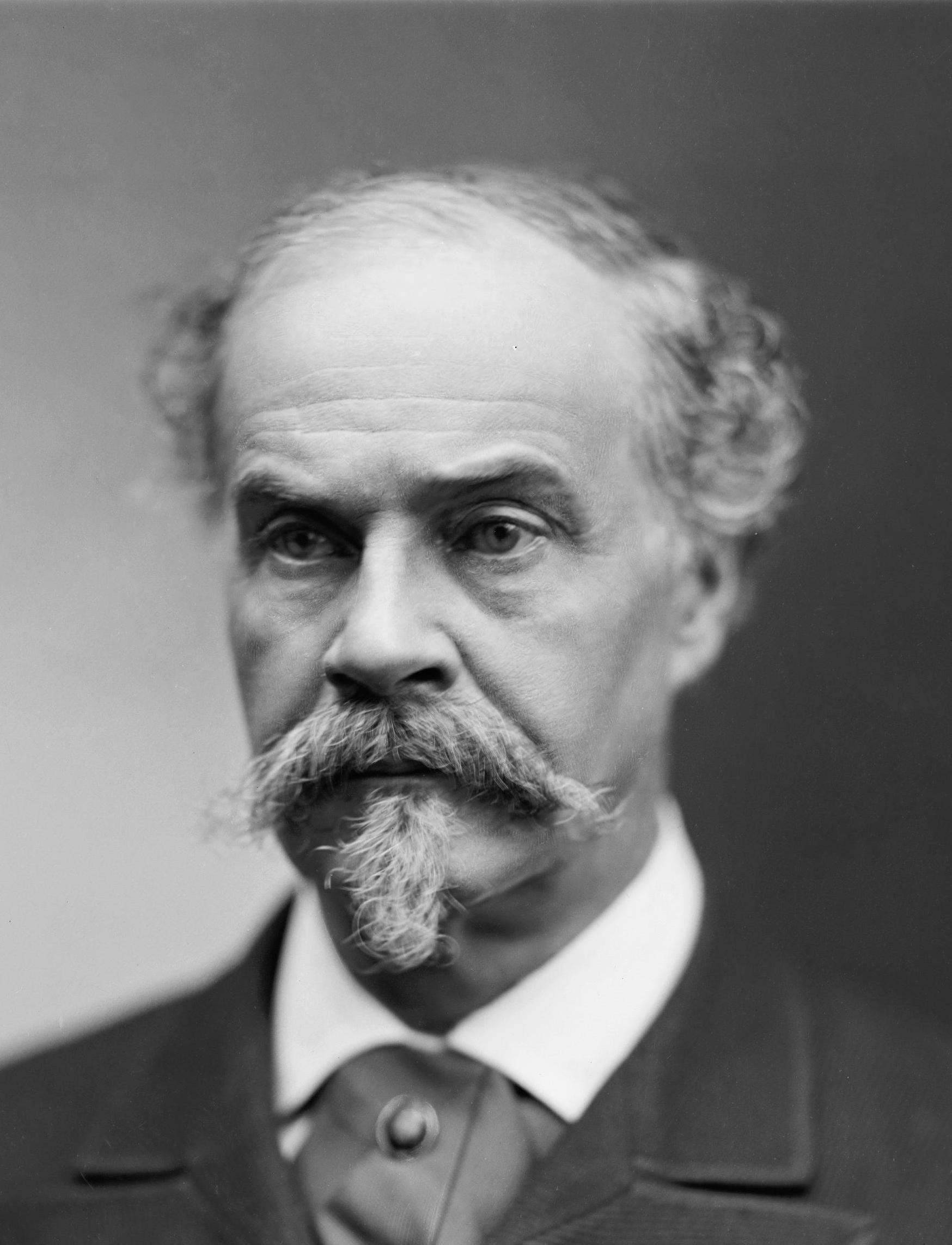
- Story c. 1865–1880
- Born: February 12, 1819
- Died: October 7, 1895 (aged 76); Vallombrosa Abbey, Reggello, Italy
- Burial place: Protestant Cemetery, Rome
- Education: Harvard College; Harvard Law School
- Spouse: Emelyn Eldredge (m. 1843)
- Children: Thomas Waldo Story; Julian Russell Story; Edith Marion, Marchesa Peruzzi de'Medici
- Parent(s): Joseph Story; Sarah Waldo (Wetmore)

William Wetmore Story (February 12, 1819 – October 7, 1895) was an American sculptor, art critic, poet, and editor.

== Life and career ==
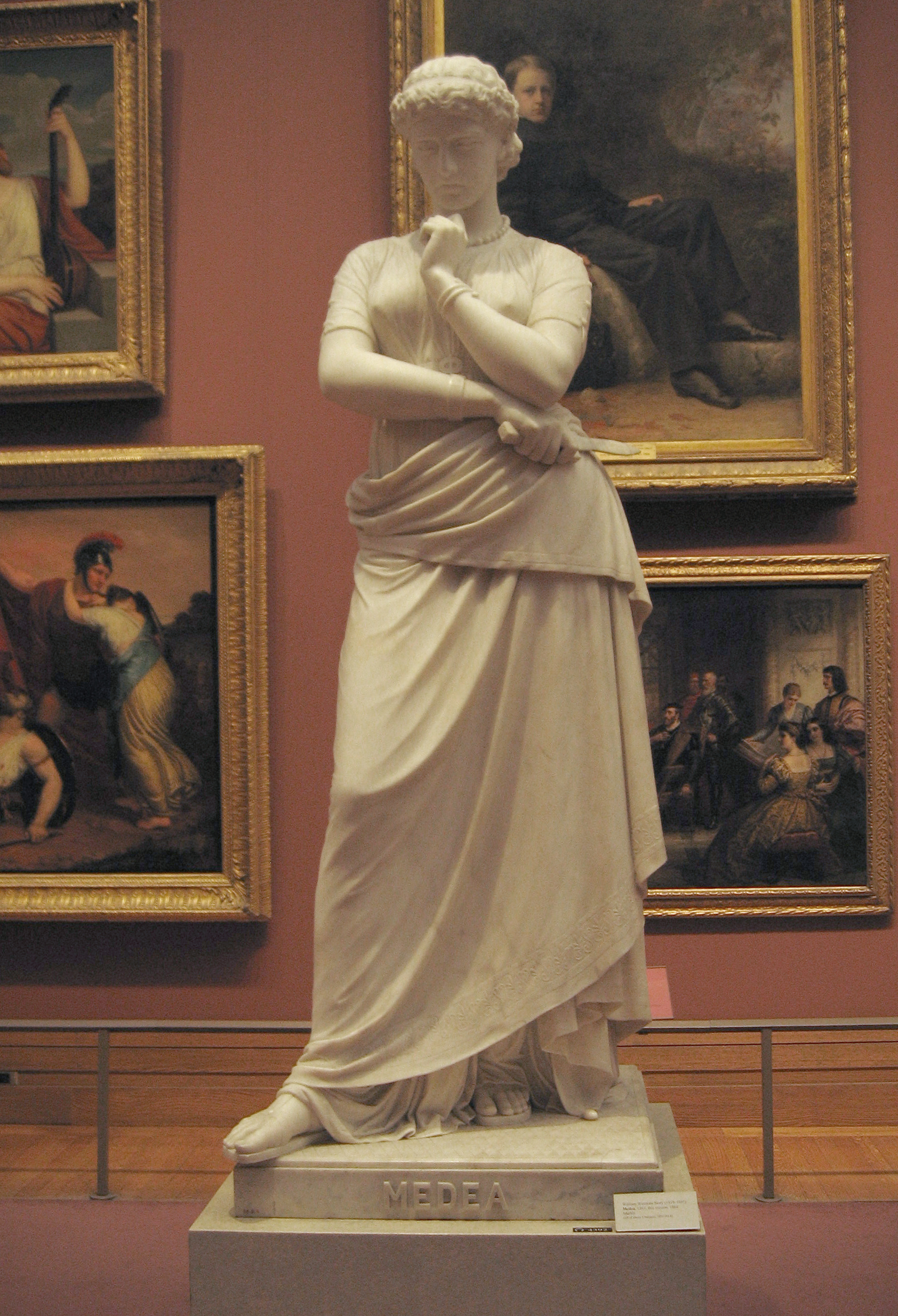
Medea, 1865, this version 1868 (Metropolitan Museum of Art)

William Wetmore Story was the son of U.S. Supreme Court judge Joseph Story and Sarah Waldo (Wetmore) Story. He graduated from Harvard College in 1838 and the Harvard Law School in 1840. After graduation, he continued his law studies under his father, was admitted to the Massachusetts bar, and prepared two legal treatises of value – Treatise on the Law of Contracts not under Seal (2 vols., 1844) and Treatise on the Law of Sales of Personal Property (1847).

He abandoned law to devote himself to sculpture, and after 1850 lived in Rome, where he had first visited in 1848, and where he counted among his friends the Brownings and Walter Savage Landor. In 1856, he received a commission for a bust of his late father, now in the Memorial Hall/Lowell Hall, Harvard University. Story's apartment in Palazzo Barberini became a central location for Americans in Rome. During the American Civil War his letters to the Daily News in December 1861 (afterwards published as a pamphlet, The American Question, i.e. of neutrality), and his articles in Blackwood's Magazine, had considerable influence on English opinion.

One of his most famous works, Cleopatra, (1858) was described and admired in Nathaniel Hawthorne's 1860 romance, The Marble Faun, and is on display in New York, NY at the Metropolitan Museum of Art in Gallery 700. Another work, the Angel of Grief, has been replicated near the Stanford Mausoleum at Stanford University. Among the other life-size statues he completed were those of Saul, Sappho, Electra, Semiramide, Delilah, Judith, Medea, Jerusalem Desolate, Sardanapolis, Solomon, Orestes, Canidia, and Shakespeare. His Saul was completed in Rome in 1865, and taken to England by Noel Wills who displayed it at Rendcomb College. It is now in the collection of North Carolina Museum of Art, Raleigh. His Sibyl and Cleopatra were exhibited at the 1863 Universal Exposition in London.

In the 1870s, Story submitted a design for the Washington Monument, then under a prolonged and troubled construction. Although the Washington National Monument Society considered his proposals "vastly superior in artistic taste and beauty" to the original 1836 design by Robert Mills, they were not adopted, and the monument was completed to Mills' scheme, only slightly modified. Story also sculpted a bronze statue of Joseph Henry on the Mall in Washington, D.C., the scientist who served as the Smithsonian Institution's first Secretary. His works Libyan Sibyl, Medea and Cleopatra are on display at the Metropolitan Museum of Art in Central Park, NYC, NY.

Story died at Vallombrosa Abbey, Italy, a place he was sentimentally attached to and which he chronicled in an informal travel journal, Vallombrosa in 1881. He is buried with his wife, Emelyn Story, in the Protestant Cemetery, Rome, under a statue of his own design, Angel of Grief.

A 1903 posthumous biography of Story (and his circle), entitled William Wetmore Story and His Friends, was penned by Henry James.

=== Family ===
His children also pursued artistic careers: Thomas Waldo Story (1854–1915) became a sculptor; Julian Russell Story (1857–1919) was a successful portrait painter; and Edith Marion (1844–1907), the Marchesa Peruzzi de' Medici, became a writer.

== Selected works ==
- Statue of George Peabody next to the Royal Exchange, City of London, 1869. A replica, erected in 1890, stands next to the Peabody Institute, Mount Vernon Park, Baltimore, Maryland.
- Joseph Henry Memorial, Washington D.C., 1883
- Chief Justice John Marshall Memorial, Washington D.C., 1884
- Angel of Grief, 1894, monument to his deceased wife.
- Statue of Joseph Story, his father, in Harvard Law School's Langdell Hall

== Selected writings ==
- Life and Letters of Joseph Story, 1851
- Wetmore Story, William (1863). Roba di Roma Volume 1. Fourth Edition, 1864, D. Appleton and Company, New York. (A collection of contemporary observations of Rome.)
- Proportions of the Human Figure, London, 1864
- Roba di Roma Volume 2. https://archive.org/details/robadiroma02stor
- Fiammetta, 1885 (a novel)
- Conversations in a Studio, Boston, 1890
- Excursions in Art and Letters, Boston, 1891
- His poems were collected in two volumes in 1885. Among the longer are “A Roman Lawyer in Jerusalem” (a rehabilitation of Judas Iscariot), "A Jewish Rabbi in Rome," Tragedy of Nero” (1872) and "Ginevra di Siena." The last named, with "Cleopatra," was included in his Graffiti d'Italia, a collection published in 1868.

== Images ==
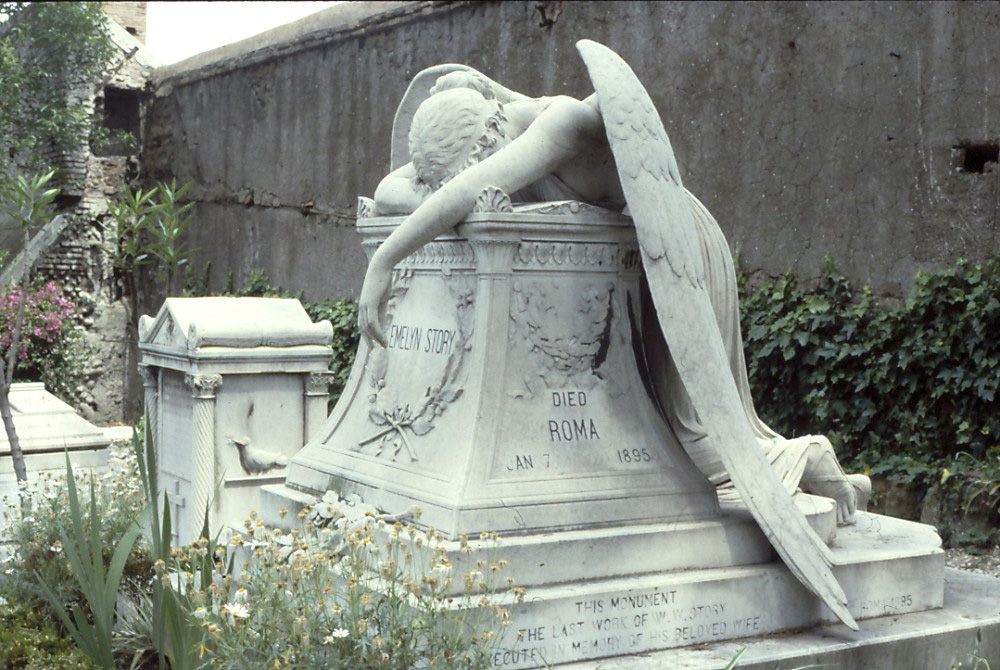
Angel of Grief, Rome

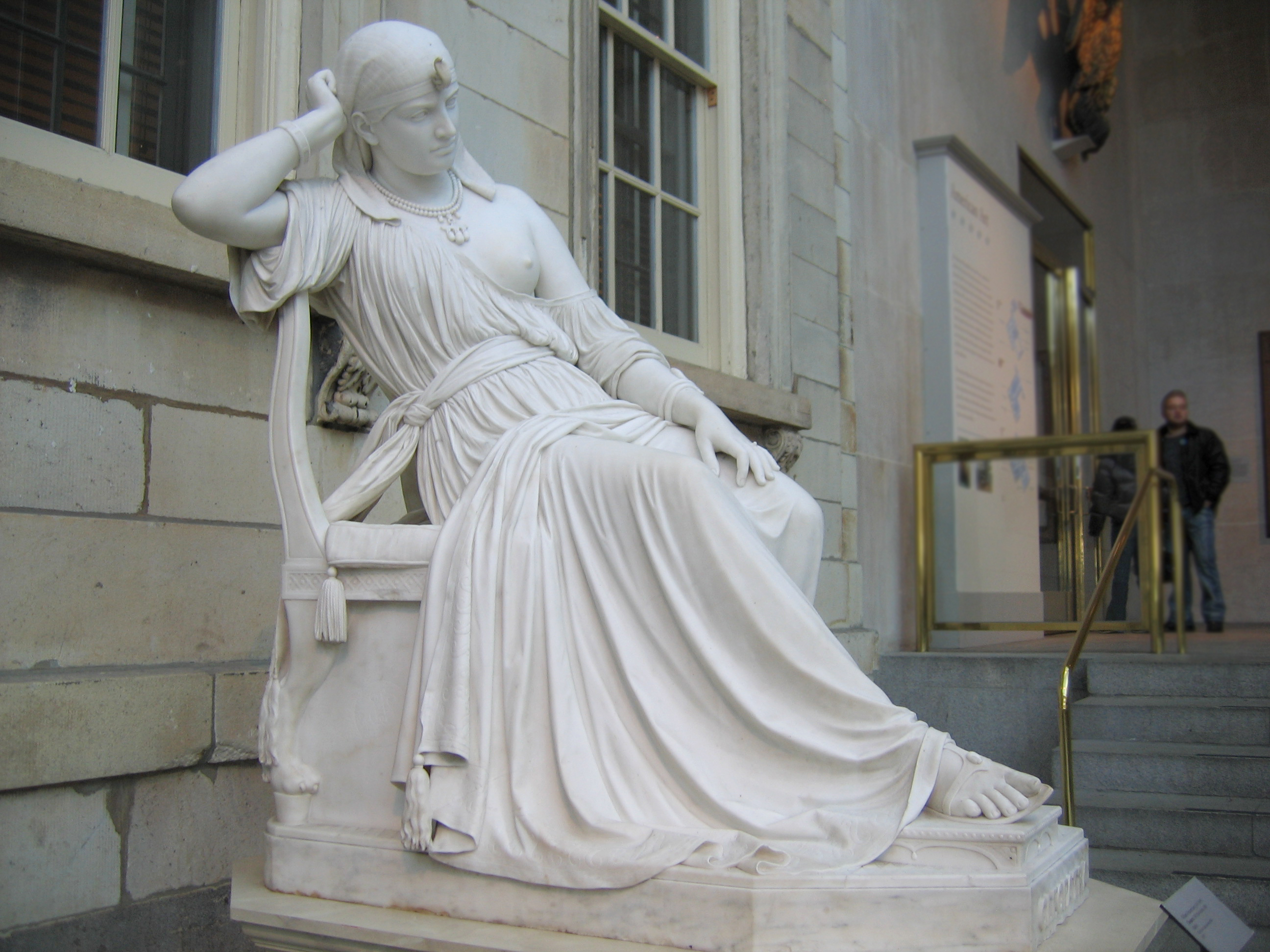
Cleopatra, Metropolitan Museum of Art (New York, New York)

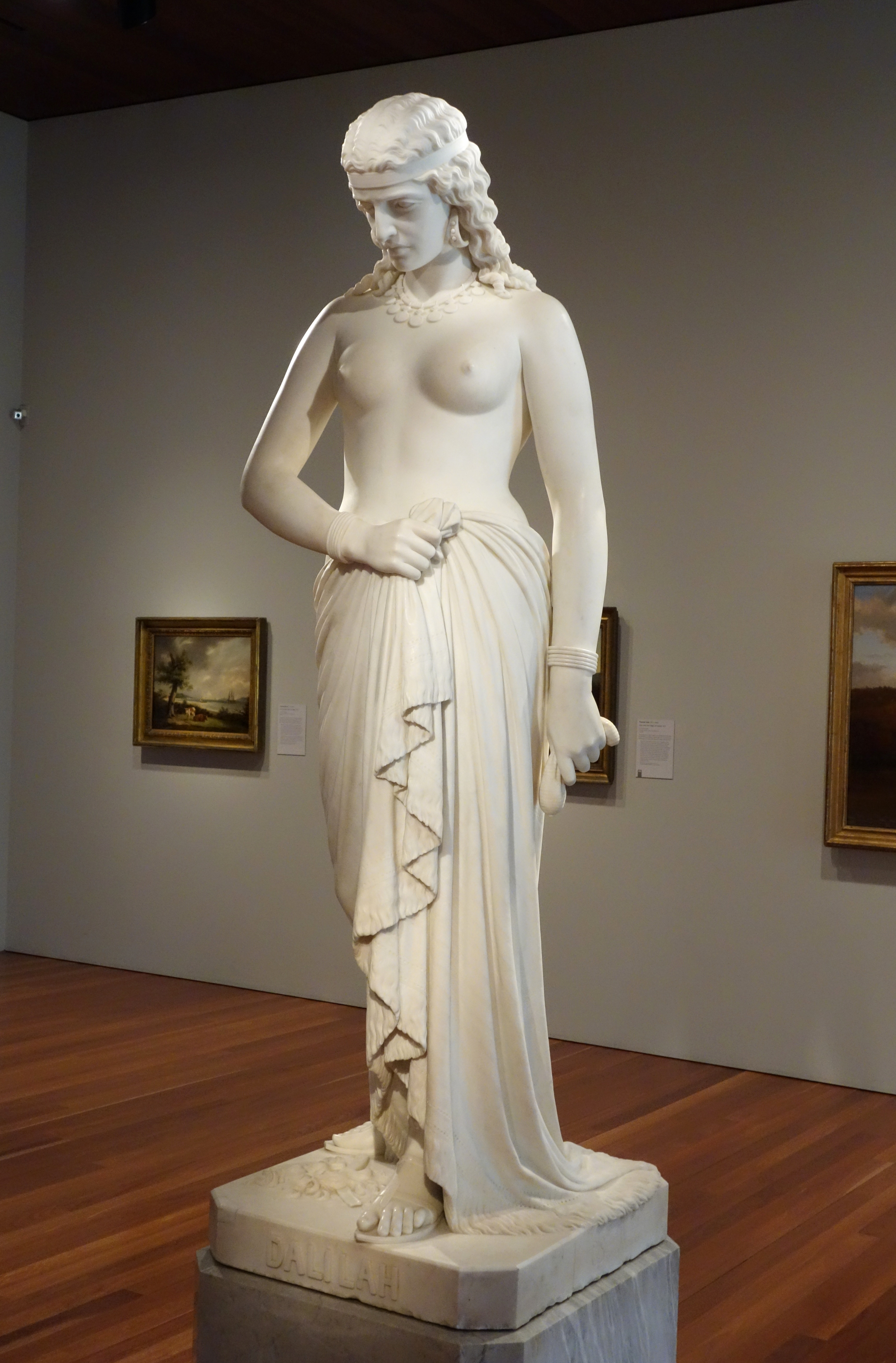
Delilah, De Young Museum (San Francisco, California)

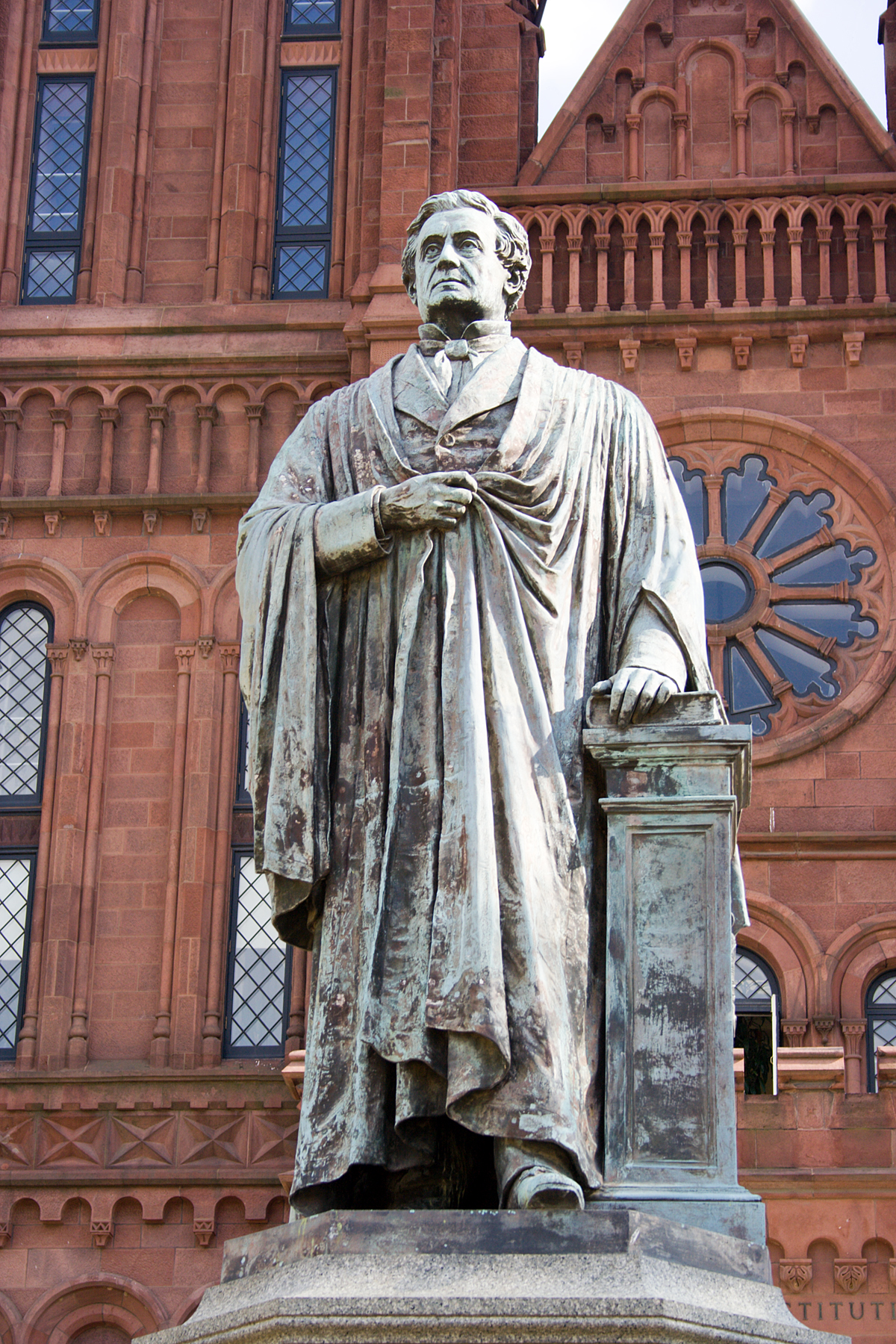
Joseph Henry before the Smithsonian Castle, Washington, D.C.

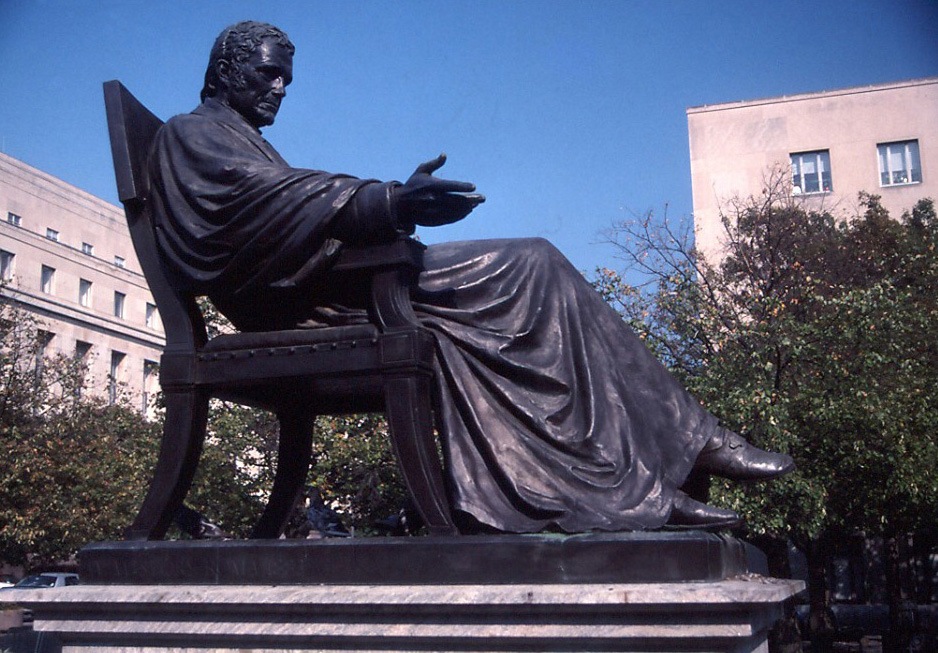
Chief Justice John Marshall, Philadelphia

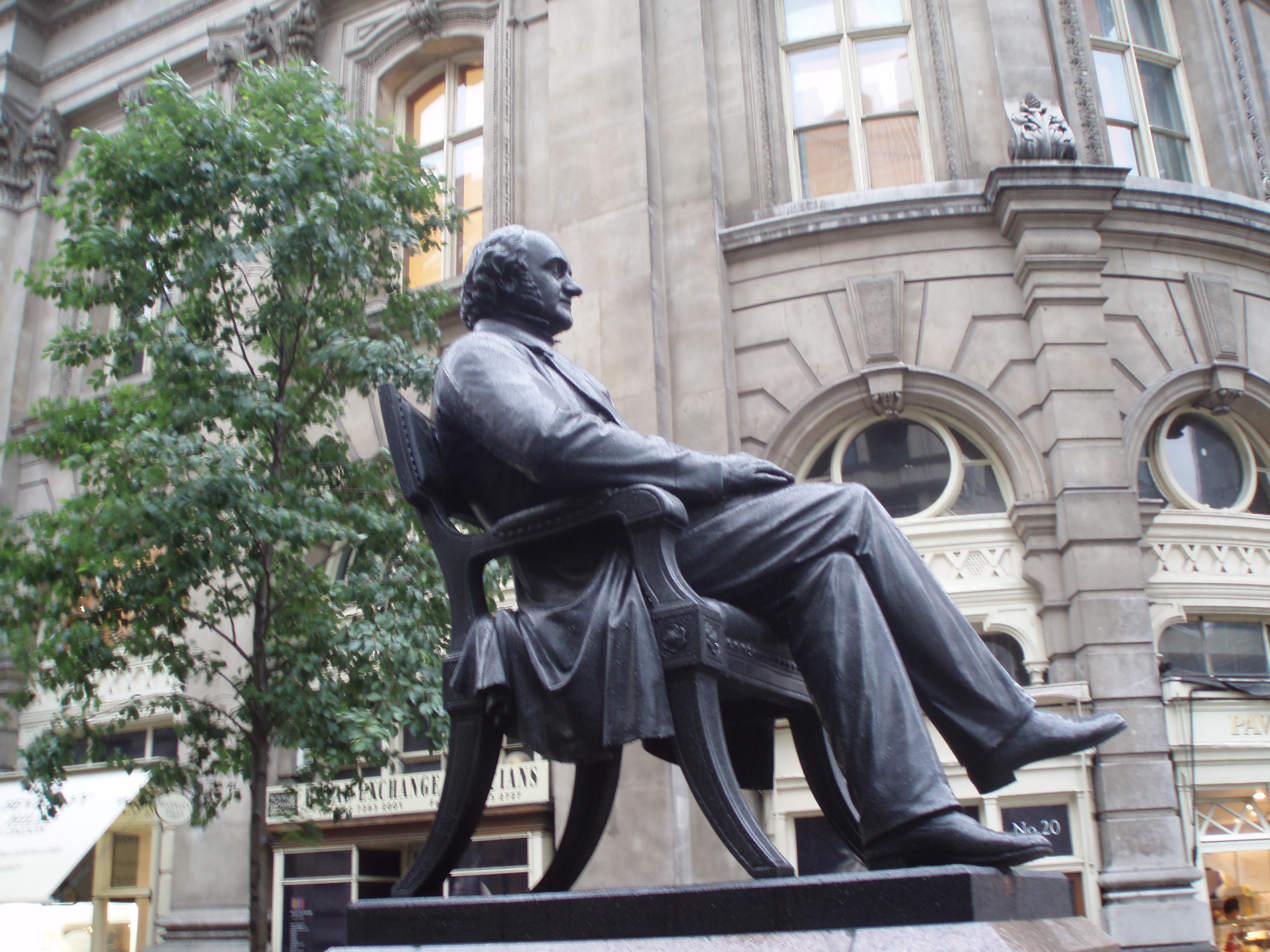
George Peabody, London

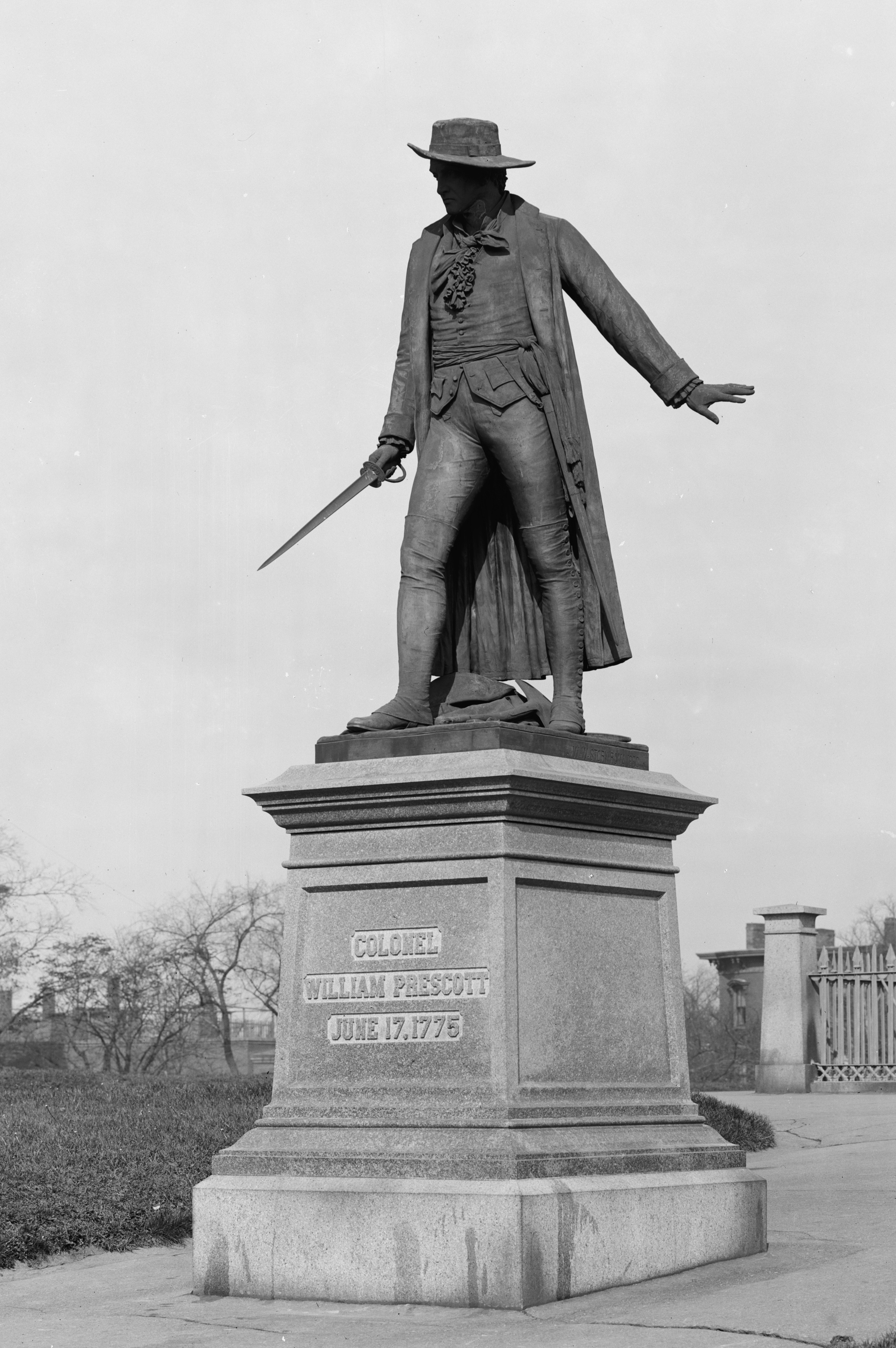
Colonel William Prescott, Charlestown, Massachusetts

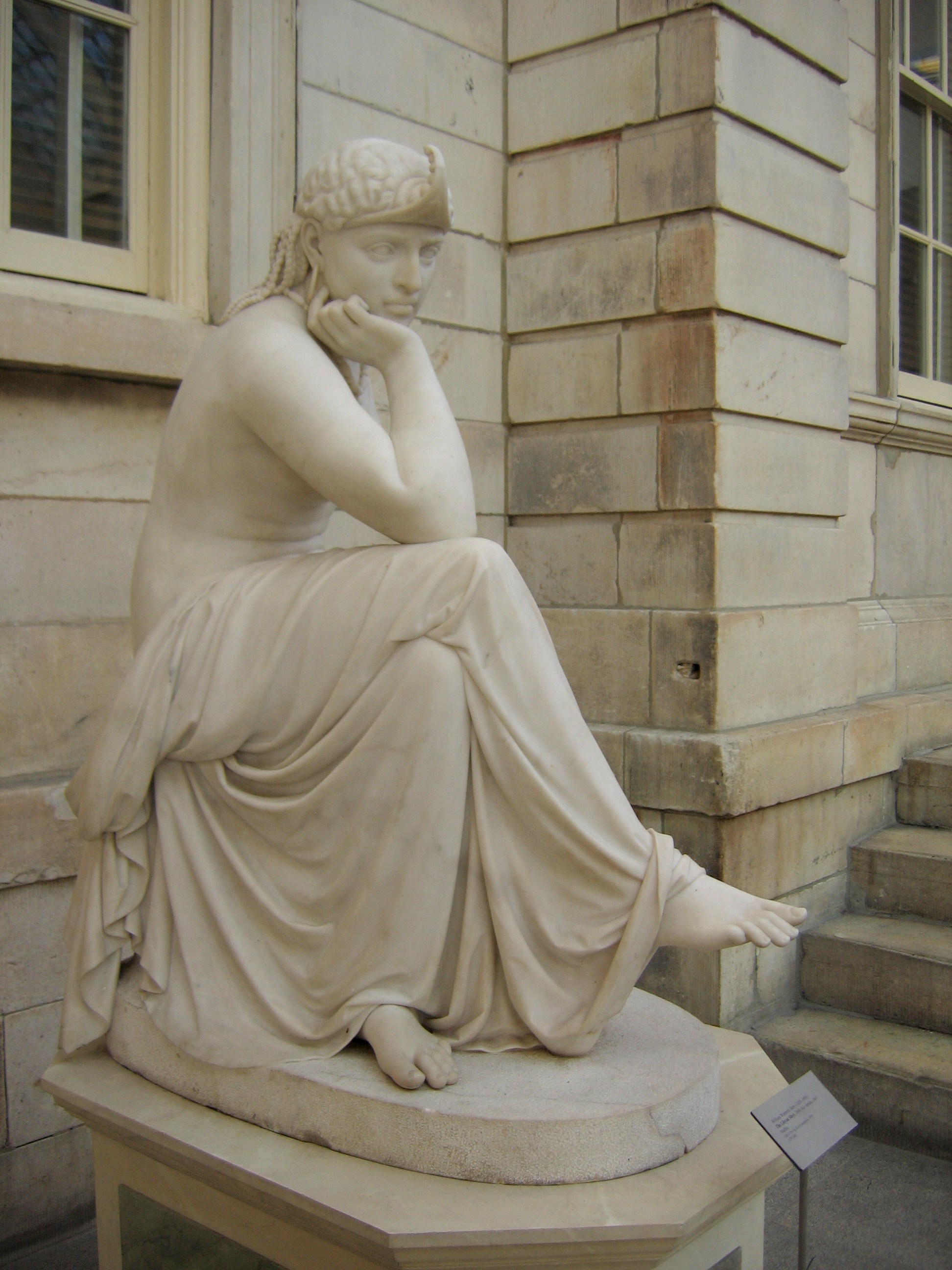
The Libyan Sibyl at the Metropolitan Museum of Art (New York, New York)

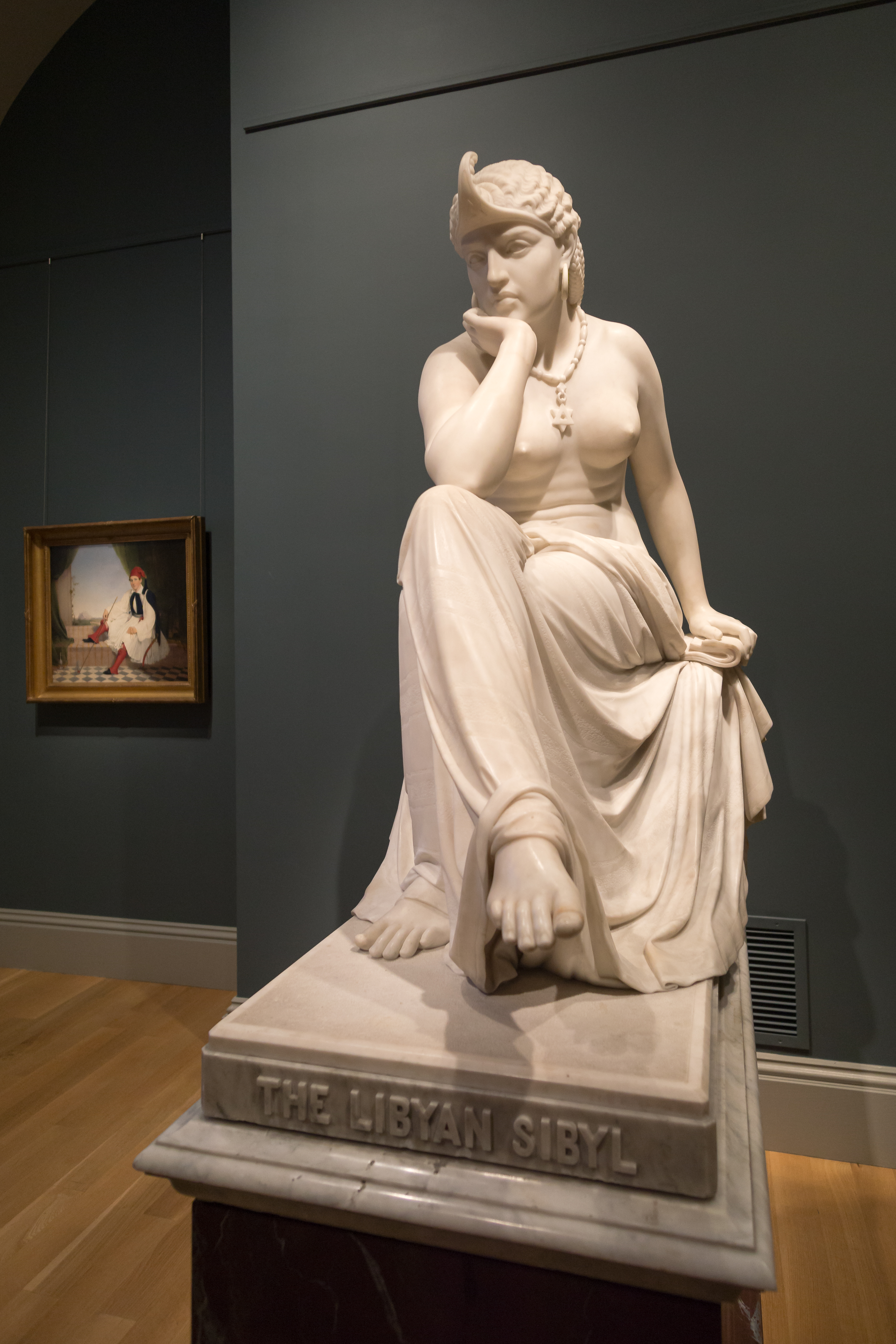
The Libyan Sibyl at the Smithsonian American Art Museum (Washington, D.C.)

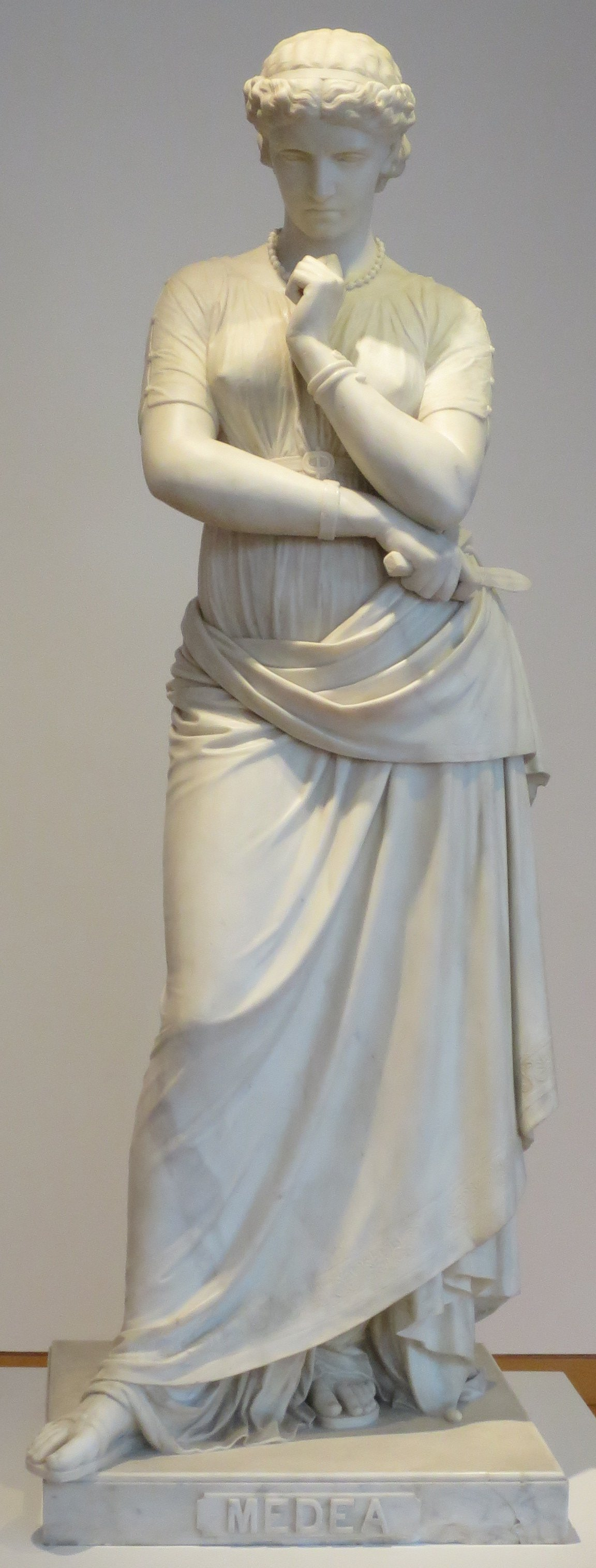
Medea at the High Museum of Art (Atlanta, Georgia)

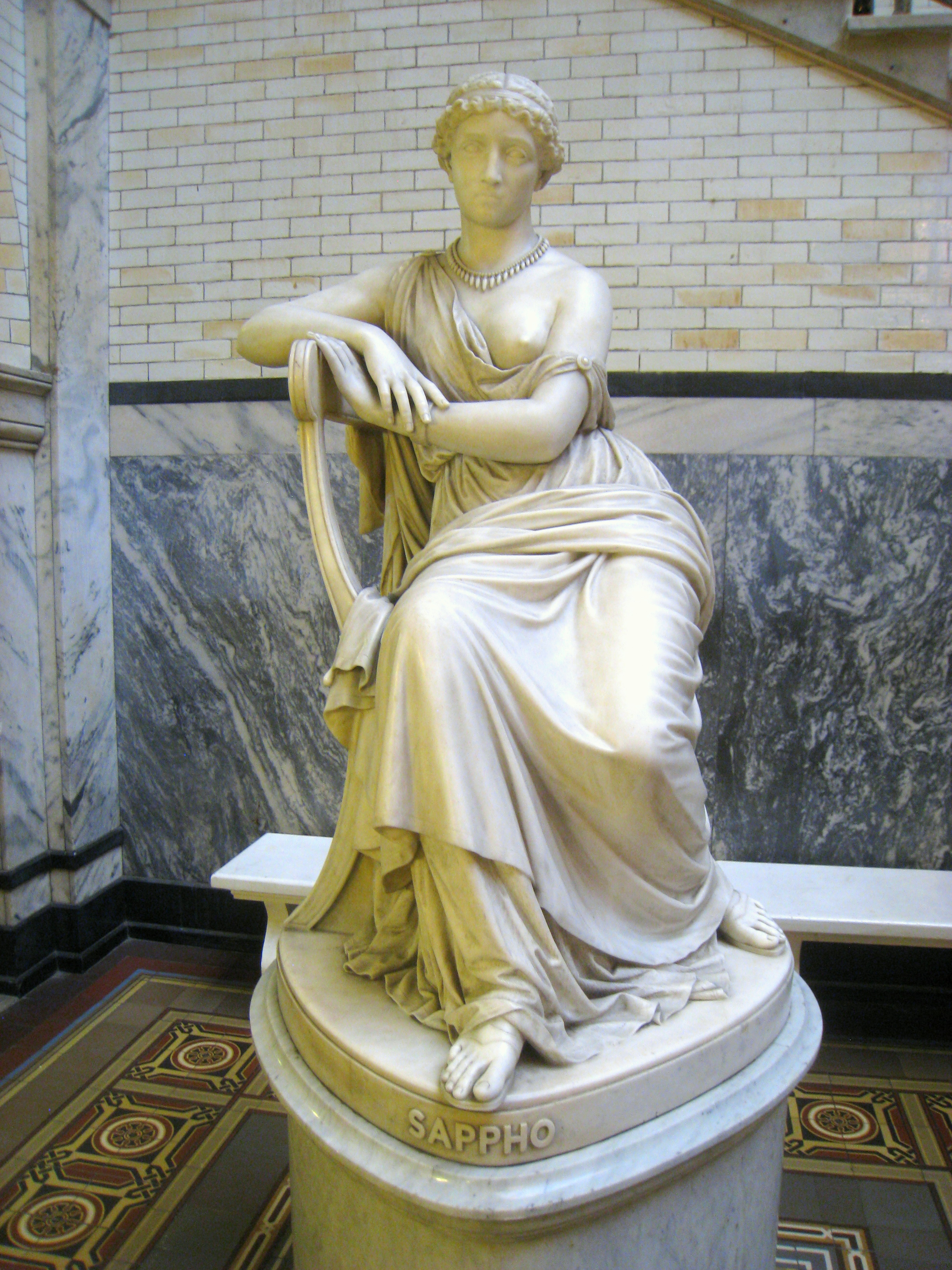
Sappho, Drexel University (Philadelphia, Pennsylvania)

== Footnotes ==
Chisholm, Hugh, ed. (1911). "Story, William Wetmore" . Encyclopædia Britannica (11th ed.). Cambridge University Press.
