= Joseph Story =

US Supreme Court justice from 1812 to 1845

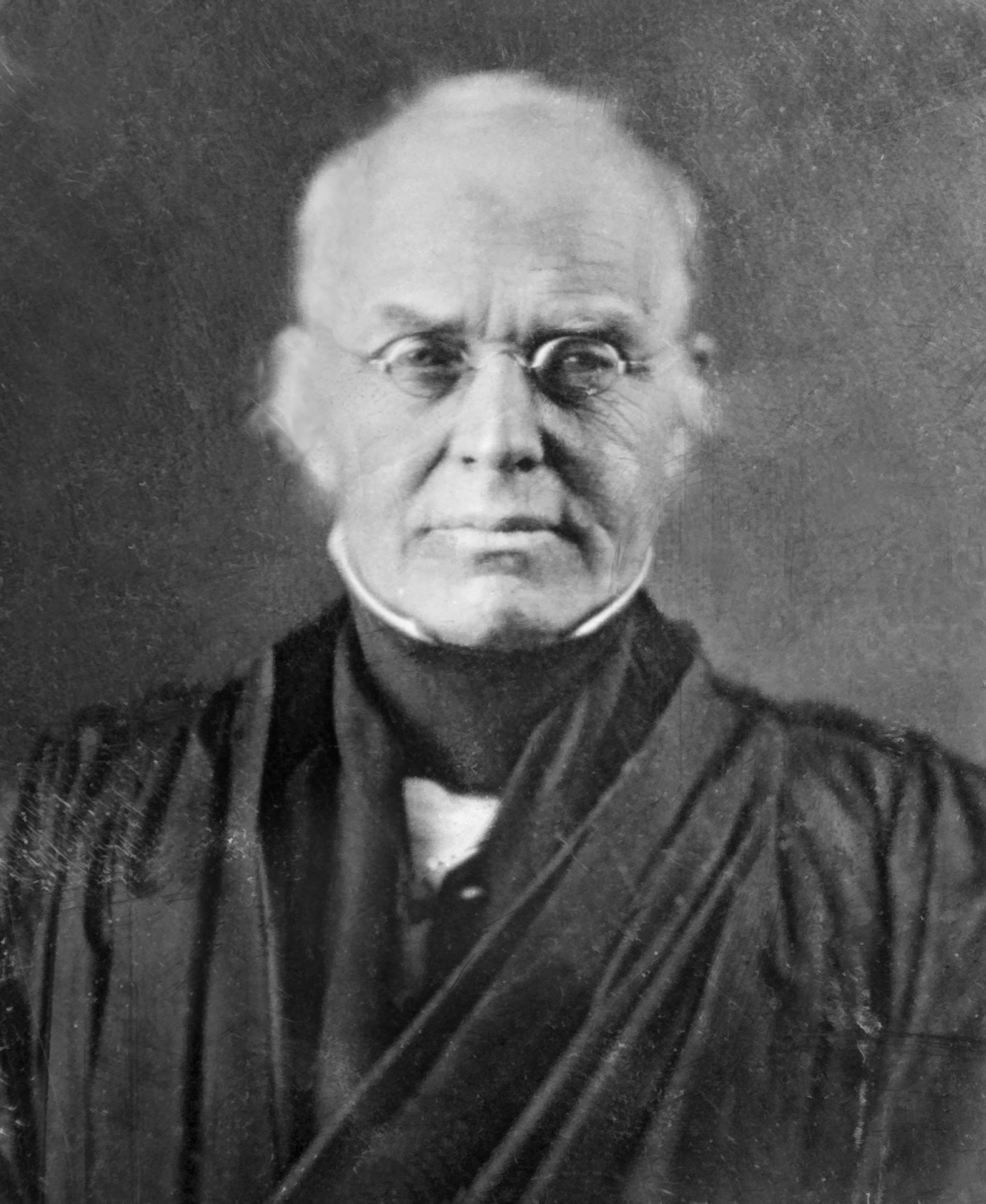
- Story in 1844

Associate Justice of the Supreme Court of the United States
- In office February 3, 1812 – September 10, 1845
- Nominated by: James Madison
- Preceded by: William Cushing
- Succeeded by: Levi Woodbury

Member of the U.S. House of Representatives from Massachusetts's 2nd district
- In office May 23, 1808 – March 3, 1809
- Preceded by: Jacob Crowninshield
- Succeeded by: Benjamin Pickman

Personal details
- Born: September 18, 1779 Marblehead, Massachusetts, U.S.
- Died: September 10, 1845 (aged 65) Cambridge, Massachusetts, U.S.
- Party: Democratic-Republican
- Education: Harvard College (AB)

Joseph Story (September 18, 1779 – September 10, 1845) was an American lawyer, jurist, and politician who served as an associate justice of the Supreme Court of the United States from 1812 to 1845. He is most remembered for his opinions in Martin v. Hunter's Lessee and United States v. The Amistad, and especially for his Commentaries on the Constitution of the United States, first published in 1833. Dominating the field in the 19th century, this work is a cornerstone of early American jurisprudence. It is the second comprehensive treatise on the provisions of the U.S. Constitution and remains a critical source of historical information about the forming of the American republic and the early struggles to define its law.

Story opposed Jacksonian democracy, saying it was "oppression" of property rights by republican governments when popular majorities began in the 1830s to restrict and erode the property rights of the minority of rich men. R. Kent Newmyer presents Story as a "Statesman of the Old Republic" who tried to be above democratic politics and to shape the law in accordance with the republicanism of Alexander Hamilton and John Marshall, and the New England Whigs of the 1820s and 1830s, including Daniel Webster. Historians generally agree that Story reshaped American law—as much or more than Marshall or anyone else—in a conservative direction that protected property rights.

== Early life ==
Story was born in Marblehead, Massachusetts. His father was Dr. Elisha Story, a member of the Sons of Liberty who took part in the Boston Tea Party in 1773. Dr. Story moved from Boston to Marblehead during the American Revolutionary War. His first wife, Ruth (née Ruddock) died and Story remarried in November 1778, to Mehitable Pedrick, nineteen, the daughter of a wealthy shipping merchant who lost his fortune during the war. Joseph was the first-born of eleven children of the second marriage. (Story also fathered seven children from his first marriage.)

As a boy, Joseph studied at the Marblehead Academy until the fall of 1794, where he was taught by schoolmaster William Harris, later president of Columbia University. At Marblehead he chastised a fellow schoolmate and Harris responded by beating him in front of the school; his father withdrew him immediately afterward. Story was accepted at Harvard University in January 1795; he joined Adelphi, a student-run literary review, and was admitted to Phi Beta Kappa society. After his college graduation, Story read law under Samuel Sewall and Samuel Putnam and was admitted to the bar in July 1801. Story practiced in Salem. A Democratic-Republican, Story served in the Massachusetts House of Representatives from 1805 to 1807. From 1807 to 1809 he was the state attorney for Essex County, Massachusetts. In 1808, he was elected to the United States House of Representatives, filling the vacancy caused by the death of Jacob Crowninshield. He served a partial term, May 23, 1808, to March 3, 1809. He was not a candidate for a full term, and resumed practicing law. In 1811, Story returned to the state House of Representatives, and was selected to serve as Speaker of the House.

Story's wife, Mary Lynde Fitch Oliver, died in June 1805, shortly after their marriage and two months after the death of his father. In August 1808, he married Sarah Waldo Wetmore, the daughter of Judge William Wetmore of Boston. They had seven children but only two, Mary and William Wetmore Story, survived to adulthood. Their son became a noted poet and sculptor—his bust of his father was mounted in the Harvard Law School Library—and published The Life and Letters of Joseph Story (2 vols., Boston and London, 1851). William Wetmore Story's biography, William Wetmore Story and His Friends, was written by the novelist Henry James.

Longtime Washington journalist Benjamin Perley Poore wrote that, though the entire Supreme Court of that day was known for its joviality, its leading exemplar of good humor was Story, "who used to assert that every man should laugh at least an hour during each day, and who had himself a great fund of humorous anecdotes."

Story was elected a Fellow of the American Academy of Arts and Sciences in 1810, and a member of the American Antiquarian Society in 1814. He would later serve as that society's vice-president from 1831 to 1845. In 1844, he was elected as a member of the American Philosophical Society.

== Supreme Court ==
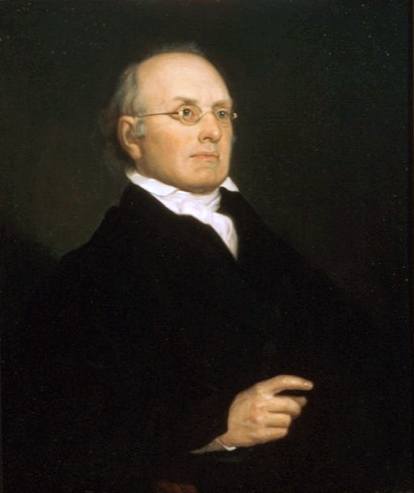
Portrait of Story by George Peter Alexander Healy

On November 15, 1811, Story was nominated by President James Madison to become an associate justice of the Supreme Court of the United States, succeeding William Cushing, an original justice of the court who had died 14 months earlier. Aged 32 years, 58 days at the time of his nomination, he became (and, as of 2026, remains) the youngest person nominated to serve on the U.S. Supreme Court. The youngest justice at the start of their Supreme Court tenure was William Johnson, who was six days younger than Story's 32 years, 138 days of age at the start of their respective tenures. Madison had previously nominated John Quincy Adams to succeed Cushing; Adams was confirmed by the United States Senate, but had declined to serve. On November 18, 1811, Story was confirmed by the Senate, and he was sworn into office on February 3, 1812.

Story's opinion in Martin v. Hunter's Lessee (1816) was profoundly significant before Story ever so much as addressed the issue explicitly. The manner in which Story framed the American republic is profoundly indicative of his philosophy. Story noted, "The Constitution of the United States was ordained and established not by the States in their sovereign capacities, but emphatically, as the preamble of the Constitution declares, by 'the people of the United States.'"

Regarding the nominal issue of the case, whether the Supreme Court possessed appellate jurisdiction over the states, Story argued that the Court must have such jurisdiction. Without national oversight over local courts, the law could become discordant. This fear of discordant law was part of Story's belief in legal science, in this instance manifested as a belief in the uniformity of law. Without uniformity, each state would be allowed to develop its own idiosyncrasies, and such provincialism ran contrary to Story's aim of a national republic. Story cited the Constitution's assertion to be "The supreme law of the land" and that "Judges in every state shall be bound thereby".

The case came to symbolize a profound transformation in Story's tenure on the Court. Initially Marshall's most influential ally, Story enjoyed the success that came along with the nearly uniform agreement by the justices in Marshall's Court. Following the election of Andrew Jackson in 1828, Story gradually became out of step with the rest of the Court. The transition started with the subsequent appointments to the bench of John McLean in 1829, Henry Baldwin in 1830, and James Wayne in 1835. This was further aggravated by the death of Marshall and the appointment in 1836 of Roger Taney, another Jacksonian Democrat, as the Chief Justice.

Story was forced to come to grips with his new position in the Jacksonian court in Proprietors of the Charles River Bridge v. Proprietors of Warren Bridge. This 1837 case involved the grant from the Massachusetts legislature, of a 40-year charter of a bridge to a group of private citizens over the Charles river. This grant was made with the provision that after the investors collected tolls for 40 years, the bridge would fall into public hands. The success of the Charles River Bridge, coupled with the growth of the cities of Boston and Charlestown, led the Massachusetts legislature to prompt the creation of the Warren Bridge, in almost the exact location, but free of toll. The creation of a new toll-free bridge, next to the previous one, was objectionable to the owners of the previous bridge, who launched a suit claiming the creation of a new bridge violated their rights. On February 14, 1837, the Court ruled 5–2 in favor of the Warren Bridge, rejecting the petitioners' claim that their charter granted them exclusive rights. Story, writing for the minority, noted "I stand upon the old law."

One of Story's more vexing opinions was Prigg v. Pennsylvania, in which he wrote for the majority in 1842. Story was forced to consider the constitutionality of a Pennsylvania personal liberty law which placed procedural requirements on those seeking to extradite fugitive slaves. Story, despite his hatred of slavery, sided with the southern justices to declare the Pennsylvania law unconstitutional. This appears especially hard to square with Story's anti-slavery philosophy, as one of the individuals kidnapped by Edward Prigg, the slave catcher in question, was actually not a slave at all. However, despite the outcome appearing entirely in favor of the South, a more accurate assessment can be gleaned from the text and time period. Concerning the former, Story argued that fugitive slaves were addressed in the U.S. Constitution, Art. 4, § 2. Despite the fact that slavery was not mentioned, Story concluded that it was all too clear that the clause was meant to secure runaway slaves for southern slaveholders. He went on to note, "The full recognition of the right and title was indispensable to the security of this species of property in all the slaveholding States; and, indeed, was so vital to the preservation of their domestic interests and institutions, that it cannot be doubted that it constituted a fundamental article, without the adoption of which the Union could not have been formed." Story's apparent endorsement of slaveholders' rights must be read through this light: that the justice felt that this was a bargain integral to the Constitution. Consequently, Story had an obligation to honor the deal struck at the Constitutional Convention. Further insight is provided by the political activity of southerners of the day. H. Robert Baker notes, "Story chose the path that he believed best supported a strong Union and rejected the natural right of slaveholders to the people they claimed as property. His resonating opinion answered southern constitutional claims in ways that protected slaveholders' rights, but not on the terms they wanted."

Though embroiled in a struggle with Chief Justice Roger Taney, Story achieved his last great victory in Swift v. Tyson. This 1842 case concerned a bill of exchange, essentially a promise of payment, given from a businessman in New York, in exchange for land in Maine. However, the individuals who received the bill of exchange, Jarius Keith and Nathaniel Norton, did not own the land in question. The central issue of the case focused on Article 34 of the Judiciary Act of 1789 which established that the Court was to employ state statutes as authoritative rules when they were applicable for the Court's cases. Story, ever the nationalist, had long despised using state statutes as authoritative when he deemed federal common law a much more preferable alternative. Simply put, Story longed to place more power in the hands of judges, in particular federal judges, instead of local legislatures. Though Story, writing for the unanimous majority, rejected the fraudulent Bill of Exchange, this remains less significant than his development of federal common law. As aforementioned, section 34 of the Federal Judiciary Act of 1789 held that courts were bound to local state statutes. Story, though had long desired to establish federal common law, had been unable to sway sufficient support to the cause. In Swift he finally rallied sufficient support to chip away at the barrier. He noted that "[Section 34 of the Judiciary Act], upon its true intendment and construction, is strictly limited to local statutes and local usages of the character before stated, and does not extend to contracts and other instruments of a commercial nature..." Swift's ultimate overruling in Erie Railroad Co. v. Tompkins marked a turning point in American civil procedure.

In 1829, he moved from Salem to Cambridge and became the first Dane Professor of Law at Harvard University, meeting with remarkable success as a teacher and winning the affection of his students, who had the benefit of learning from a sitting Supreme Court justice. He was a prolific writer, publishing many reviews and magazine articles, delivering orations on public occasions, and publishing books on legal subjects which won high praise on both sides of the Atlantic. Among Story's works of this period, one of the most important is the Justice's Commentaries on the Constitution. The commentaries are divided into three sections, the first two concerning the colonial origins of the confederation and revolution, and the final section concerns the origins of the Constitution. Story's Commentaries encapsulate and expound his ideology. Within his Commentaries, Story, in particular, attacks notions of state sovereignty. Even at this moment when his time on the Court was drawing towards a close, Story remained concerned with the welfare of the Union. His guide to the Constitution stressed the sovereignty of the people rather than the states, and extensively attacked those elements, i.e., southern sovereignty advocates, that Story felt could destabilize the Union. Story's Commentaries summarize much of the Justice's philosophy and demonstrate how Story sought to use his work off the bench to continue to foster popular sovereignty over state sovereignty.

Many legal scholars attribute the development of remittitur in American law – a procedural device by which the trial judge can reduce a jury's damages award in a civil suit on the grounds that it is excessive – to Story's decision in the 1822 case Blunt v. Little (in which Story was sitting on the United States District Court for the District of Massachusetts). While remittitur was already known from English law, Story was the first to allow the procedure to be used on the initiative of the defendant and on the grounds of excessive damages – in prior use, it had only been used by plaintiffs to correct legal errors in a jury award (awarding more damages than was legally permitted) which might have resulted in the award being overturned on appeal. Story's innovation was enormously influential in American law and has been accepted throughout the federal and state courts.

== Significance ==
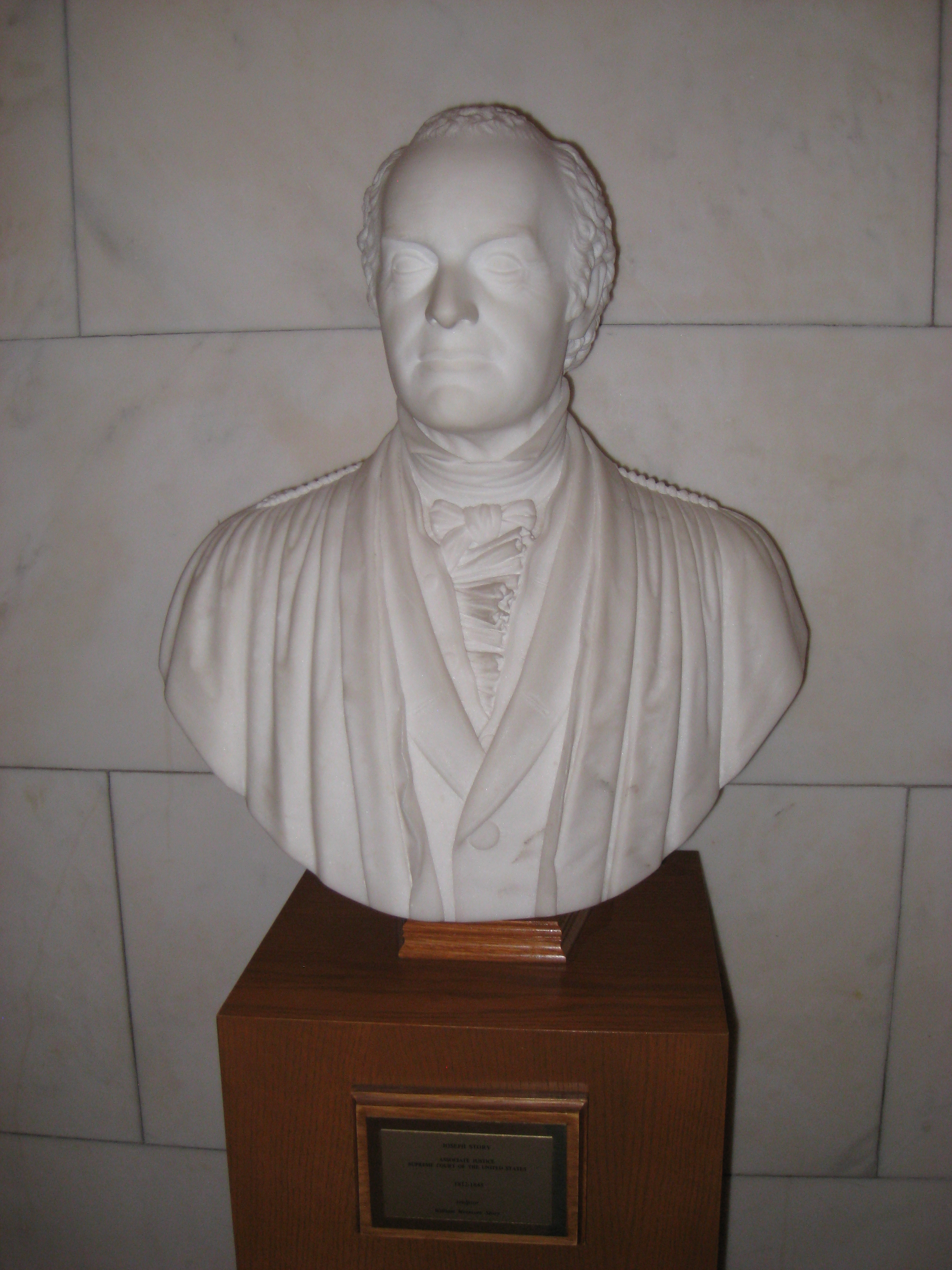
Bust of Joseph Story, sculpted by his son William Wetmore Story, currently on display at the United States Supreme Court building

Justice Story remains one of the most significant figures in early American constitutional history. Of the many justices of the Marshall Court, only the chief justice himself wrote more opinions than Story. In the 33 years that Story sat on the Court, he would transition from being an ally of Marshall to the last of an old race. Justice Story, throughout his time on the Marshall and Taney courts, championed the notion of legal science. He believed that the Union could be made stronger through the proper application of law, in particular that proper application necessitated uniformity of application. Consequently, federal control and judicial oversight were important tools to craft a more centralized Union. Story was in many respects a creature of New England; however, his chief aim was the creation of a strong Union. Consequently, several of his opinions, such as Prigg, emerge as efforts to protect the Union at the expense of black lives and freedom. Justice Story's jurisprudence stressed the importance of nationalism through economic centralization and judicial review. While aspects of his jurisprudence would fall into the minority with the rise of Jackson, he continued to guide the Constitutional dialogue through cases like Prigg and Swift.

== Works ==
Justice Story was one of the most successful American authors of the first half of the 19th century. "By the time he turned 65, on September 18, 1844, he earned $10,000 a year from his book royalties. At this point, his salary as Associate Justice was $4,500."

Among his publications are:

- Commentaries on the Law of Bailments (1832)--Link to an 1846 printing.
- Commentaries on the Constitution of the United States: Volume I, Commentaries on the Constitution of the United States: Volume II and Commentaries on the Constitution of the United States: Volume III (3 vols., 1833), a work of profound learning which is still the standard treatise on the subject. Story published a One Volume Abridgment the same year.
- The Constitutional Class Book: Being a Brief Exposition of the Constitution of the United States (1834)--Story published an expanded edition, entitled A Familiar Exposition of the Constitution of the United States, in 1840.
- Commentaries on the Conflict of Laws (1834), by many regarded as his most significant work. The second edition in 1841 was revised, corrected and greatly enlarged.
- Commentaries on Equity Jurisprudence (2 vols., 1835–1836)--Vol. 1 1846 printing; Vol. 2 1866 printing-revised by Isaac F. Redfield.
- Equity Pleadings (1838)
- Law of Agency (1839)--Link to an 1851 printing.
- Law of Partnership (1841)--Link to the second edition published in 1846.
- Law of Bills of Exchange (1843)--Link to second edition published in 1847.
- Law of Promissory Notes (1845)--Link to the 1851 printing.
- A Familiar Exposition of the Constitution of the United States (1847).
- The power of solitude : a poem, in two parts (1804)--A new and improved edition. Salem : Published by Barnard F. Macanulty. (First edition. Boston : Printed by John Russell, 1800 or 1802?)

He also edited several standard legal works. His Miscellaneous Writings, first published in 1835, appeared in an enlarged edition in 1851.

The Life and Letters of Joseph Story (1851), edited by his son William Wetmore Story, was published in two volumes: Volume I and Volume II.

Story contributed articles (in full, and or as part of larger articles) to The Encyclopedia Americana, including Death, Punishment of. William Wetmore Story, in The Life and Letters of Joseph Story, Volume 2, listed the articles Joseph Story wrote for The Encyclopedia Americana: Common Law, Congress of the United States, Conquest, Contracts, Corpus Delicti, Courts of England and the United States, Criminal Law (Story's contribution begins at "To the preceding article. ... "), Death, Punishment of, Domicil, Equity, Evidence, Jury, Lien, Law, Legislation, and Codes (Story's contribution begins on p. 581), Natural Law, Nations, Law of, Prize, and Usury. Story is sometimes identified as an "eminent American jurist" by the editors when he is a joint author of an article. See the Law, Legislation, and Codes article for an example.

=== Circuit decisions ===
Story's decisions while riding circuit for the U.S. Court of Appeals for the First Circuit were compiled by John Gallison (two volumes), William P. Mason (five volumes), Charles Sumner (three volumes), and William Wetmore Story (three volumes). These decisions have been praised for establishing legal principles of admiralty and equity.

== Death and legacy ==
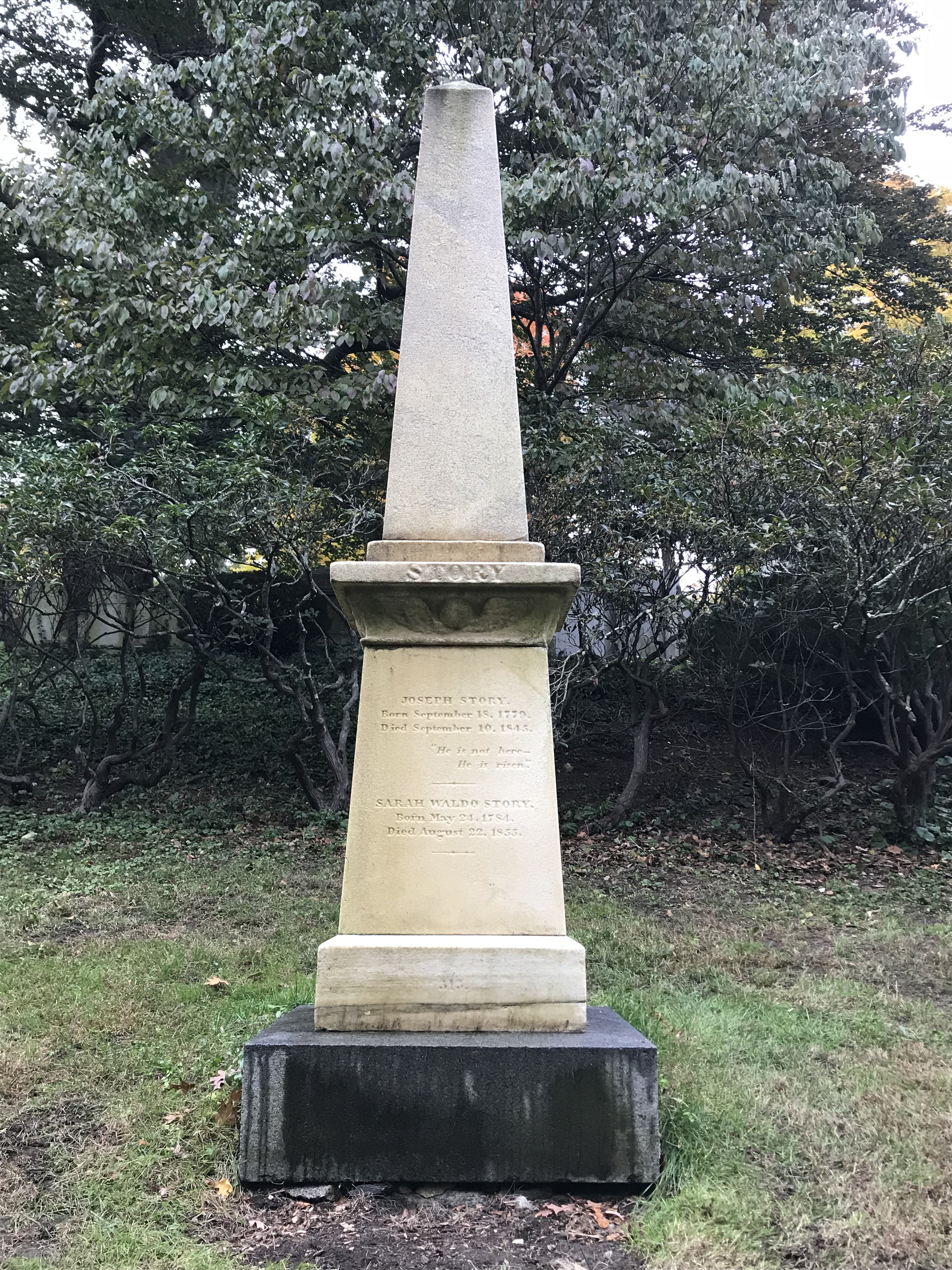
Story's grave

Justice Story spoke at length at the dedication ceremony for Mount Auburn Cemetery in 1831, which helped spark the "rural cemetery" movement and to link that movement to the development of the republic. Story emphasized the ways that rural cemeteries contributed to an ordered and well-regulated republic of law. Story's speech set the model for dozens of subsequent addresses over the next few decades, through that of Edward Everett at the Consecration of the National Cemetery at Gettysburg in 1863. Garry Wills focuses on it as an important precursor to President Abraham Lincoln's Gettysburg Address.

Upon his death in 1845, Story was buried there "as are scores of America's celebrated political, literary, religious, and military leaders. His grave is marked by a piece of sepulchral statuary executed by his son, William Wetmore Story."

Story is the namesake for Story County, Iowa.

== See also ==
- List of justices of the Supreme Court of the United States
- Bibliography of the United States Constitution
- List of United States federal judges by longevity of service

== Notes ==
U.S. House of Representatives
Preceded by Jacob Crowninshield	Member of the U.S. House of Representatives from Massachusetts's 2nd congressional district 1808–1809	Succeeded by Benjamin Pickman
Legal offices
Preceded by William Cushing	Associate Justice of the Supreme Court of the United States; 1812–1845	Succeeded by Levi Woodbury
