= Cleopatra (William Wetmore Story) =

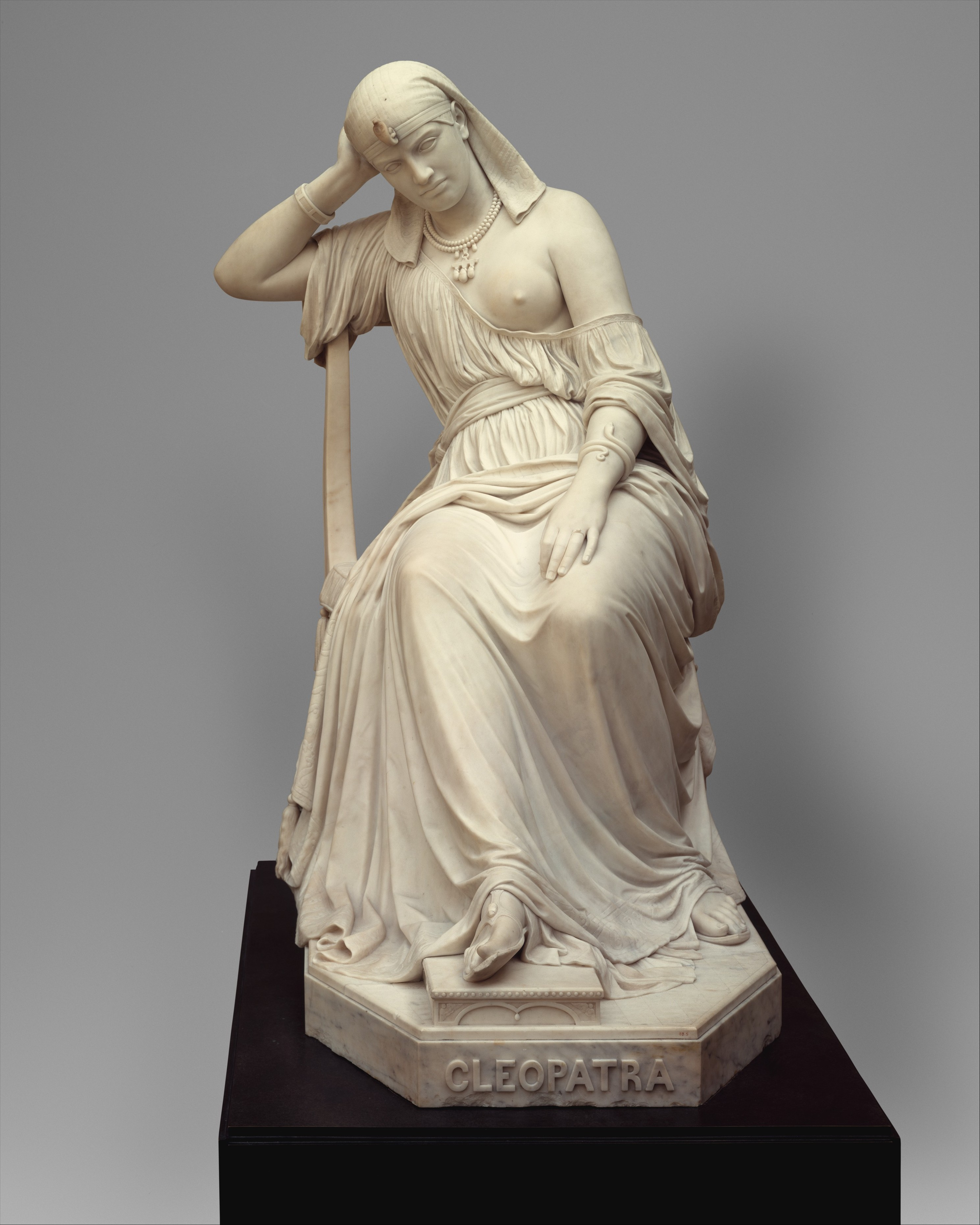
- Artist: William Wetmore Story
- Year: Started 1858, completed 1869
- Medium: Marble
- Dimensions: 141 cm × 84.5 cm × 130.8 cm (56 in × 33.3 in × 51.5 in)
- Location: Metropolitan Museum of Art; New York City
- Accession: 88.5a–d

Cleopatra is a 19th-century sculpture by American sculptor William Wetmore Story. Carved from marble, the sculpture depicts the Egyptian ruler Cleopatra. The sculpture is currently in the collection of the Metropolitan Museum of Art.
