= Waldo Story =

American sculptor

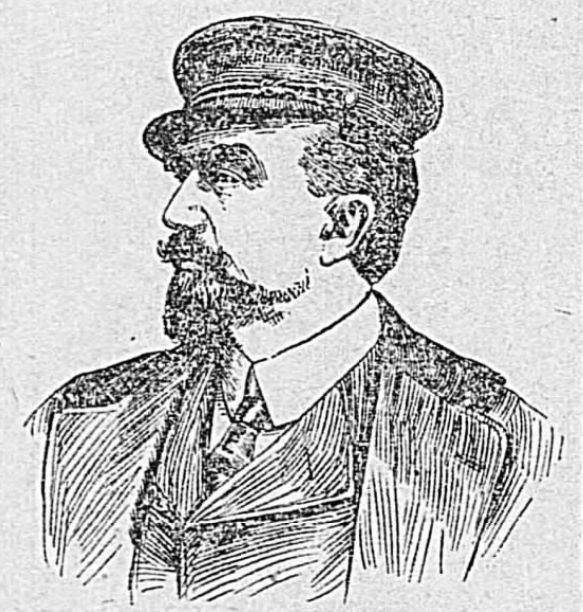
- Born: Thomas Waldo Story; December 9, 1854; Paris, France
- Died: October 23, 1915 (aged 60); New York, New York
- Occupations: Artist, writer
- Spouses: Ada Maud Broadwood (m. 1883) Bessie Abott (m. 1912)
- Father: William Wetmore Story

Thomas Waldo Story (December 9, 1854 – October 23, 1915) was an American sculptor, art critic, poet and literary editor, living for most of his life in Rome, Italy.

== Life ==
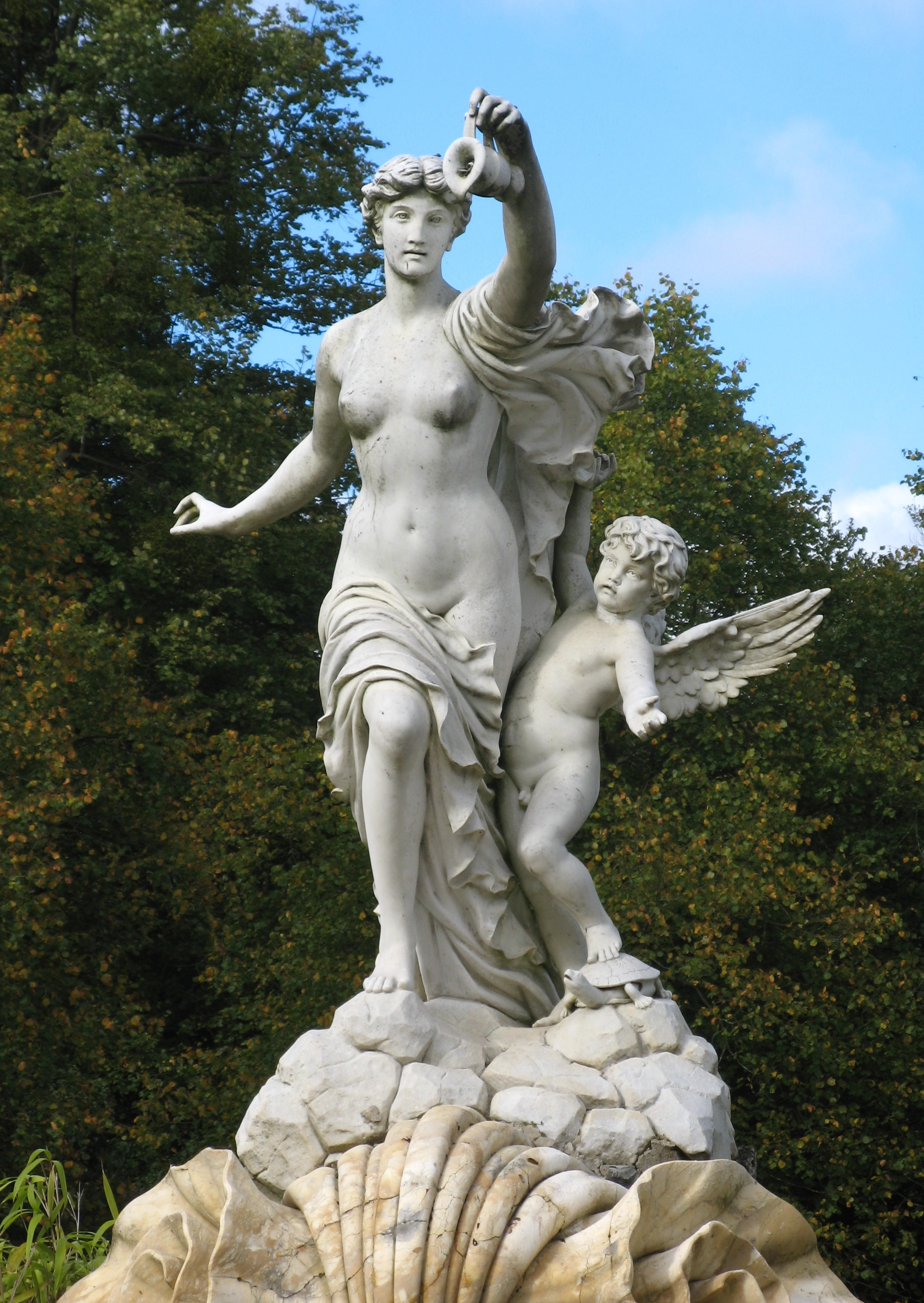
Central figures in the Fountain of Love, Cliveden, sculpted by Story

Story was born in Paris in 1854 to the sculptor William Wetmore Story, son of early Supreme Court justice Joseph Story.

While his parents lived in Rome, Waldo was educated in England at Eton College and at Christ Church, Oxford. Afterwards, he moved to Rome himself where he shared a studio with his father and, after the latter's death in 1895, took over his lease of an apartment in the Palazzo Barberini.

In 1883 Waldo Story married Ada Maud Broadwood (1856–1932), the eldest child of Thomas Capel Broadwood and Mary Davidson Hennin. In 1912, he was married for a second time to opera singer Bessie Pickens Abott.

Waldo Story frequently stayed in England where he was friends with James Abbott McNeill Whistler. He is best known for his Fountain of Love in the grounds of Cliveden, Buckinghamshire.

He died at his home in New York City in 1915.

== Gallery ==
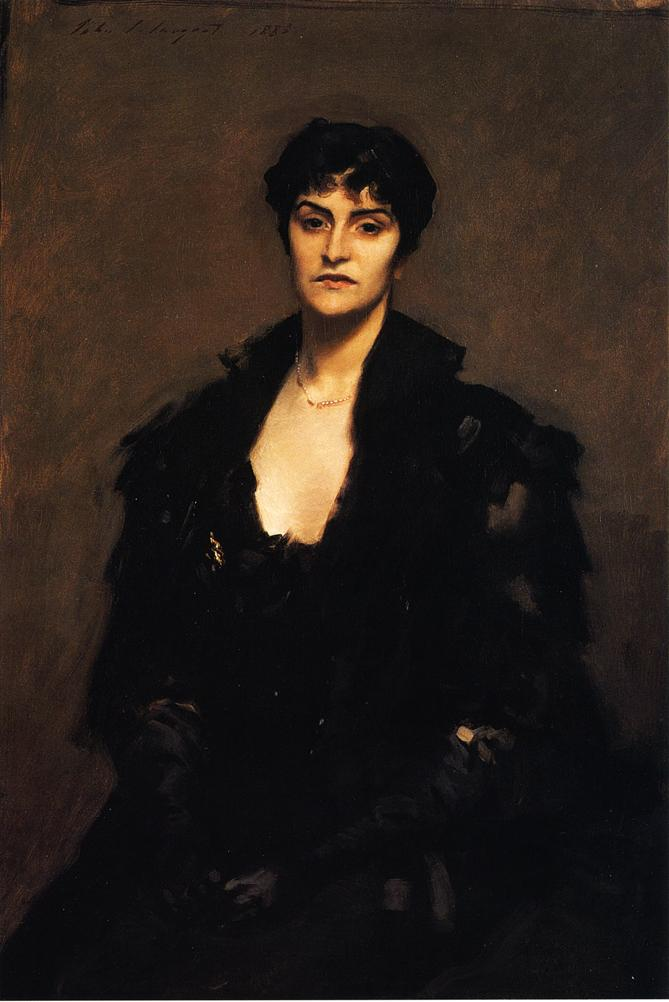
Mrs. Ada Maud Story by John Singer Sargent, 1883

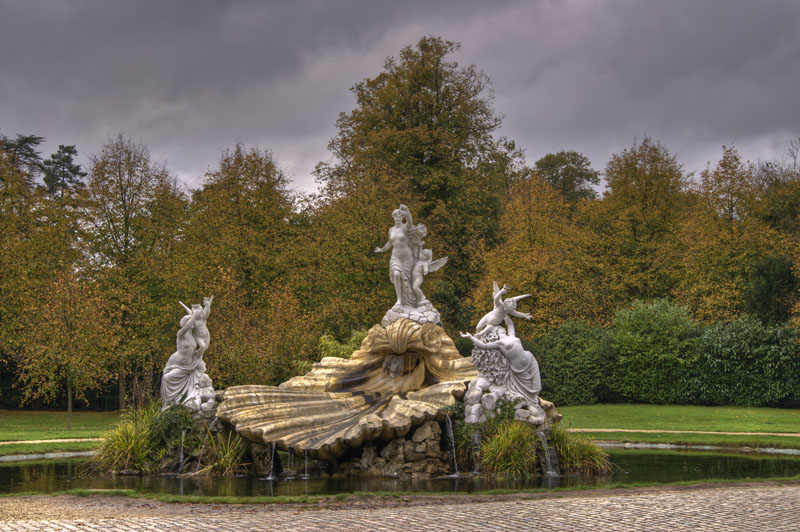
Fountain of Love

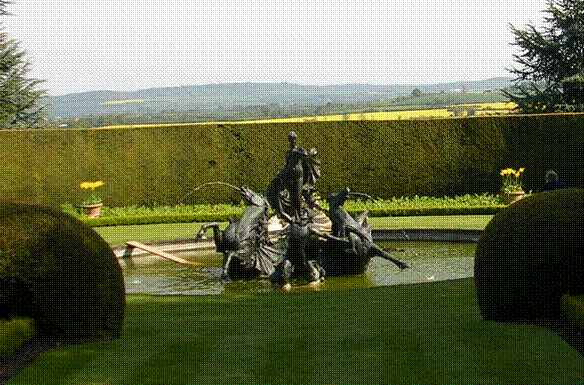
Sculpture by Thomas Waldo Story at the Ascott House, Buckinghamshire
