= Angel of Grief =

1894 cemetery sculpture by William Wetmore Story

Coordinates: 41°52′34″N 12°28′46″E

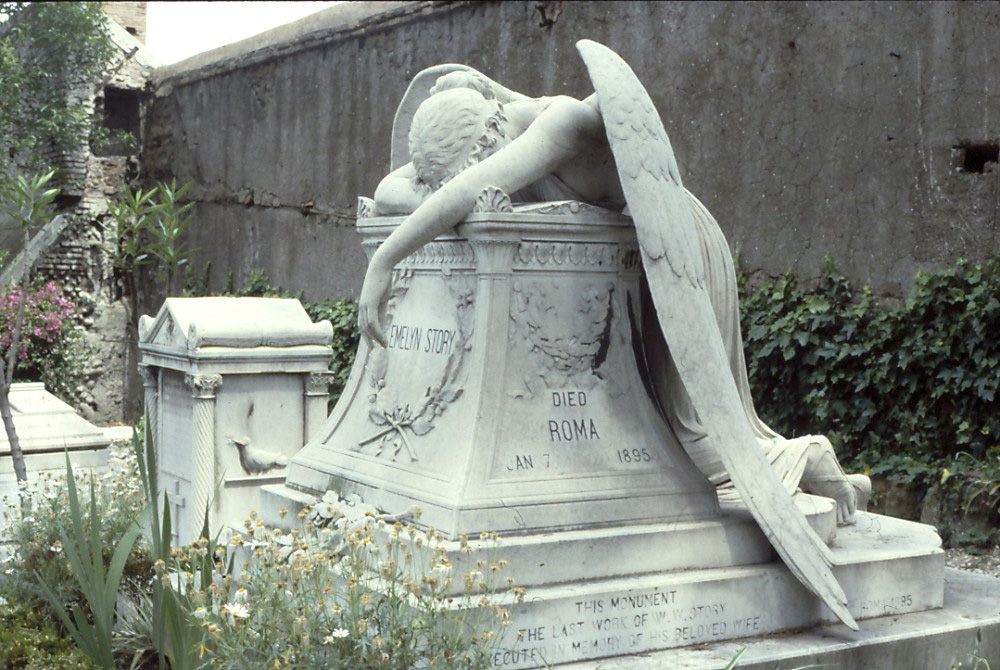
The original Angel of Grief in Rome

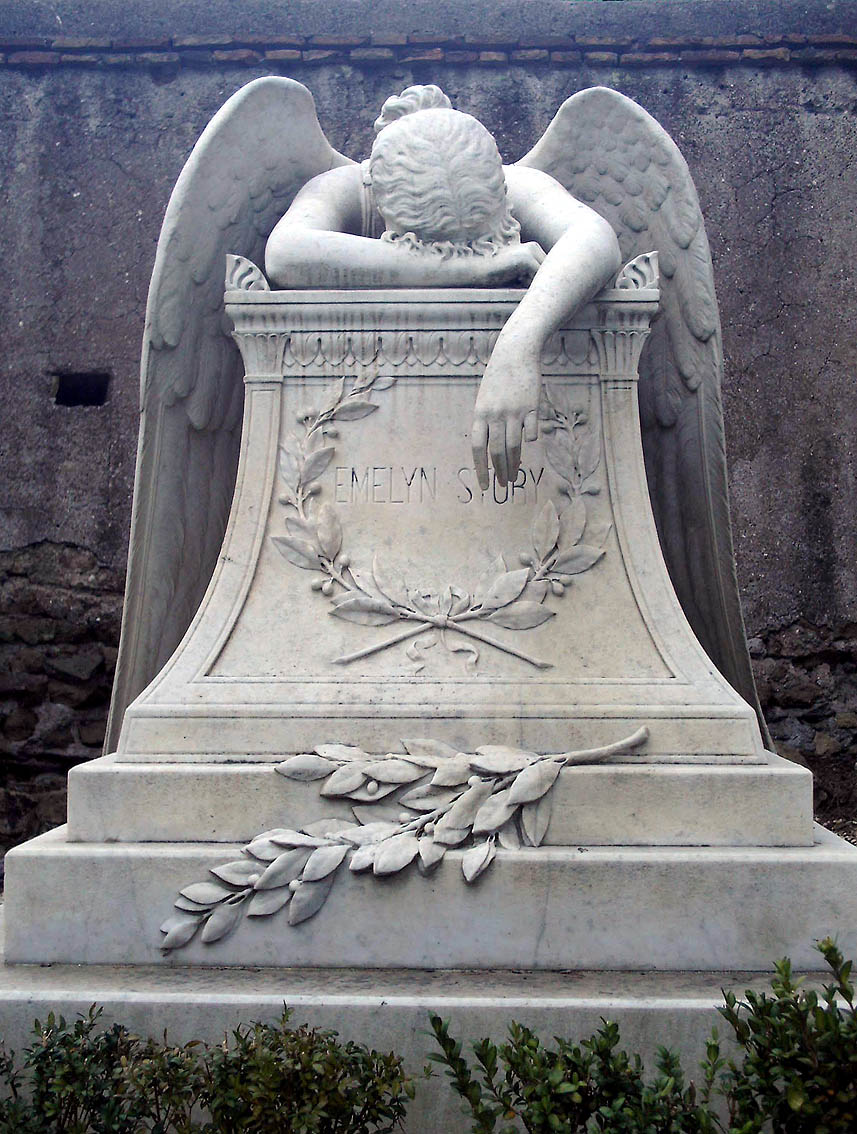
Front view of the Angel of Grief in Rome

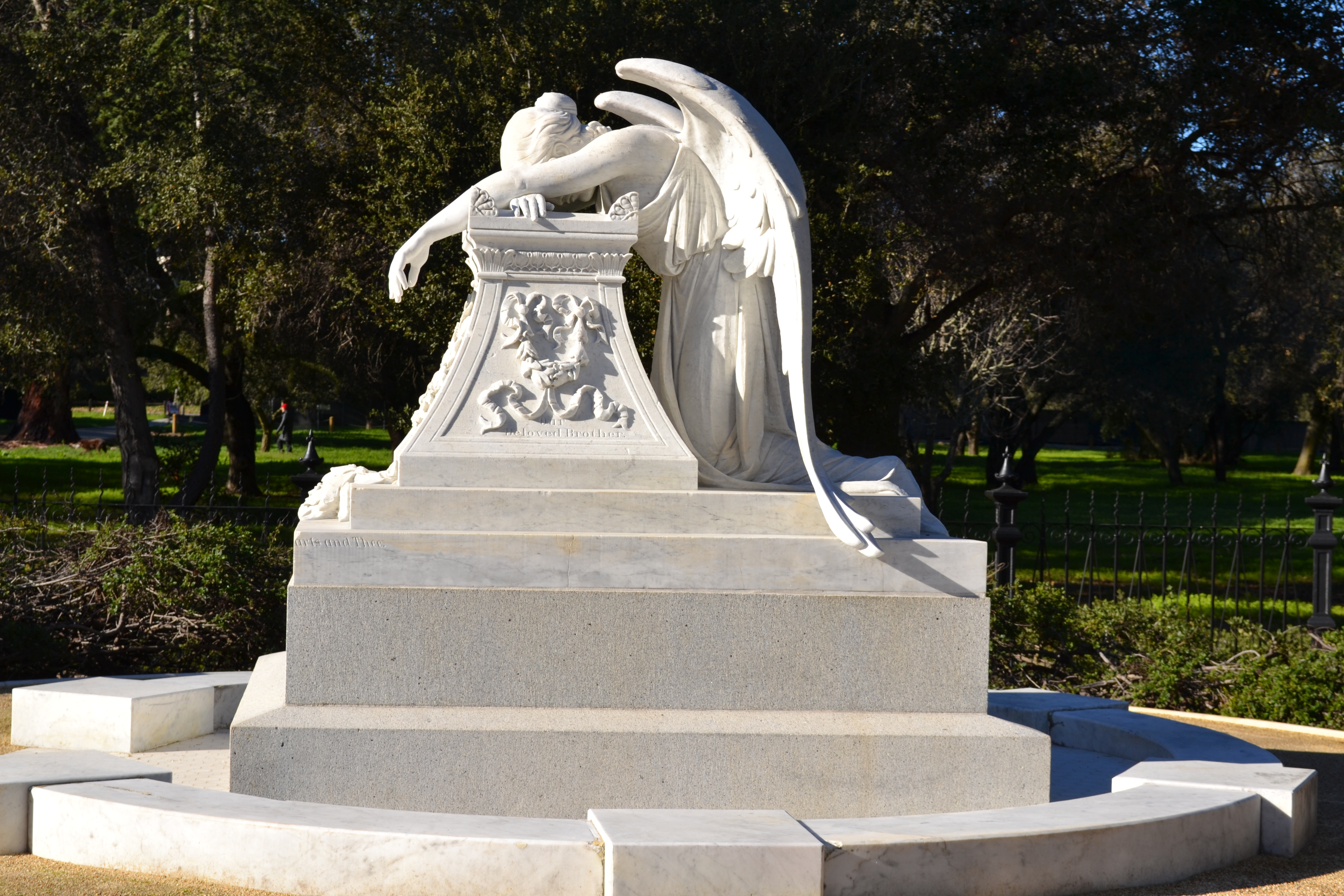
Henry Lathrop monument, profile view, at Stanford University

Angel of Grief or the Weeping Angel is an 1894 sculpture by William Wetmore Story for the grave of his wife Emelyn Story at the Protestant Cemetery in Rome. Its full title bestowed by the creator was The Angel of Grief Weeping Over the Dismantled Altar of Life.

== History ==
This was Story's last major work prior to his death, dying a year after his wife. The statue's creation was documented in an 1896 issue of Cosmopolitan Magazine: according to this account, his wife's death so devastated Story that he lost interest in sculpture, but was inspired to create the monument by his children, who recommended it as a means of memorializing the woman. Unlike the typical angelic grave art, "this dramatic life-size winged figure speaks more of the pain of those left behind" by appearing "collapsed, weeping and draped over the tomb".

== Term usage ==
The term is now used to describe multiple grave stones throughout the world erected in the style of the Story stone. A feature in The Guardian called the design "one of the most copied images in the world". Story himself wrote that "It represents the angel of Grief, in utter abandonment, throwing herself with drooping wings and hidden face over a funeral altar. It represents what I feel. It represents Prostration. Yet to do it helps me."

== Pop culture ==
Prominent replicas of the Angel of Grief sculpture include the Henry Lathrop monument, located in the Stanford University Arboretum. Lathrop was the brother of Jane Stanford, the co-founder of the university. The original replica was built in 1901, but was severely damaged in the San Francisco earthquake of 1906, leading to its replacement in 1908. After years of neglect, the 1908 replacement was fully restored in 2001. Another example is the Cassard angel, erected around 1908 in the Green-Wood Cemetery in Brooklyn, New York.

The image has also been used in popular culture, such as in an album covers for The Tea Party's The Edges of Twilight (1995), Evanescence’s EP (1998) and Nightwish's Once (2004), the singles cover of Lenny Kravitz song Calling All Angels, and in the 2012 film The Woman in Black.

== Gallery ==
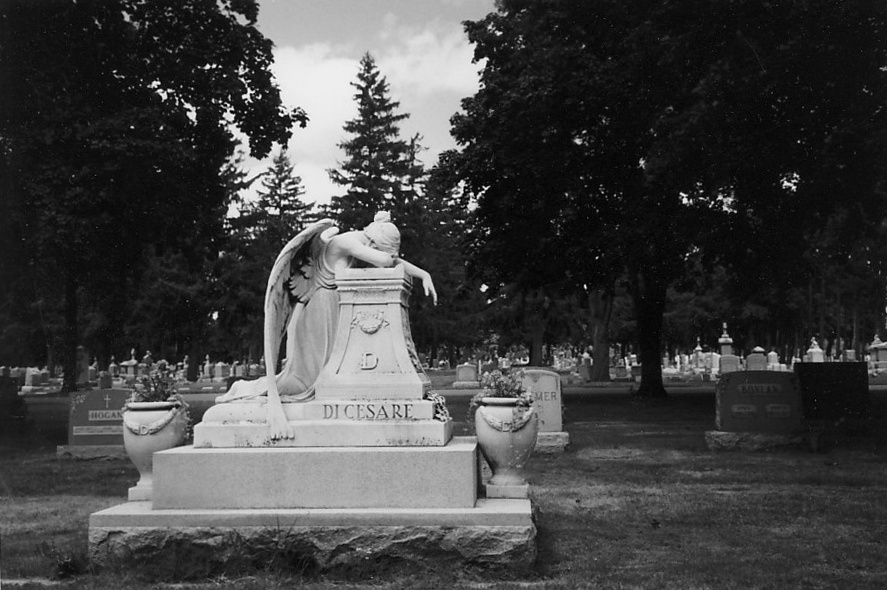
Holy Sepulchre Cemetery, Rochester, New York

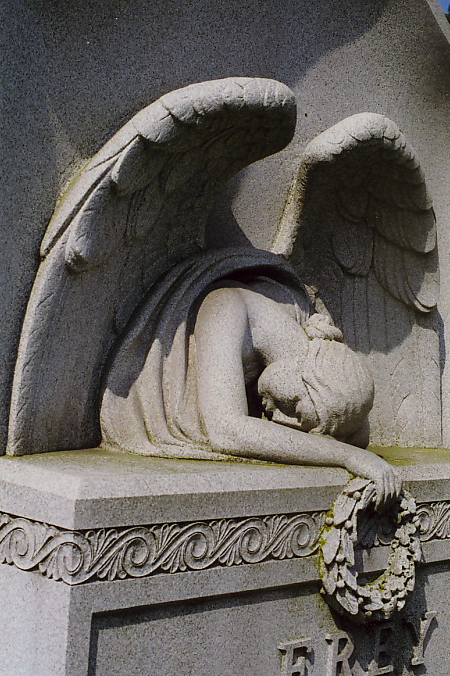
A loose interpretation in York, Pennsylvania

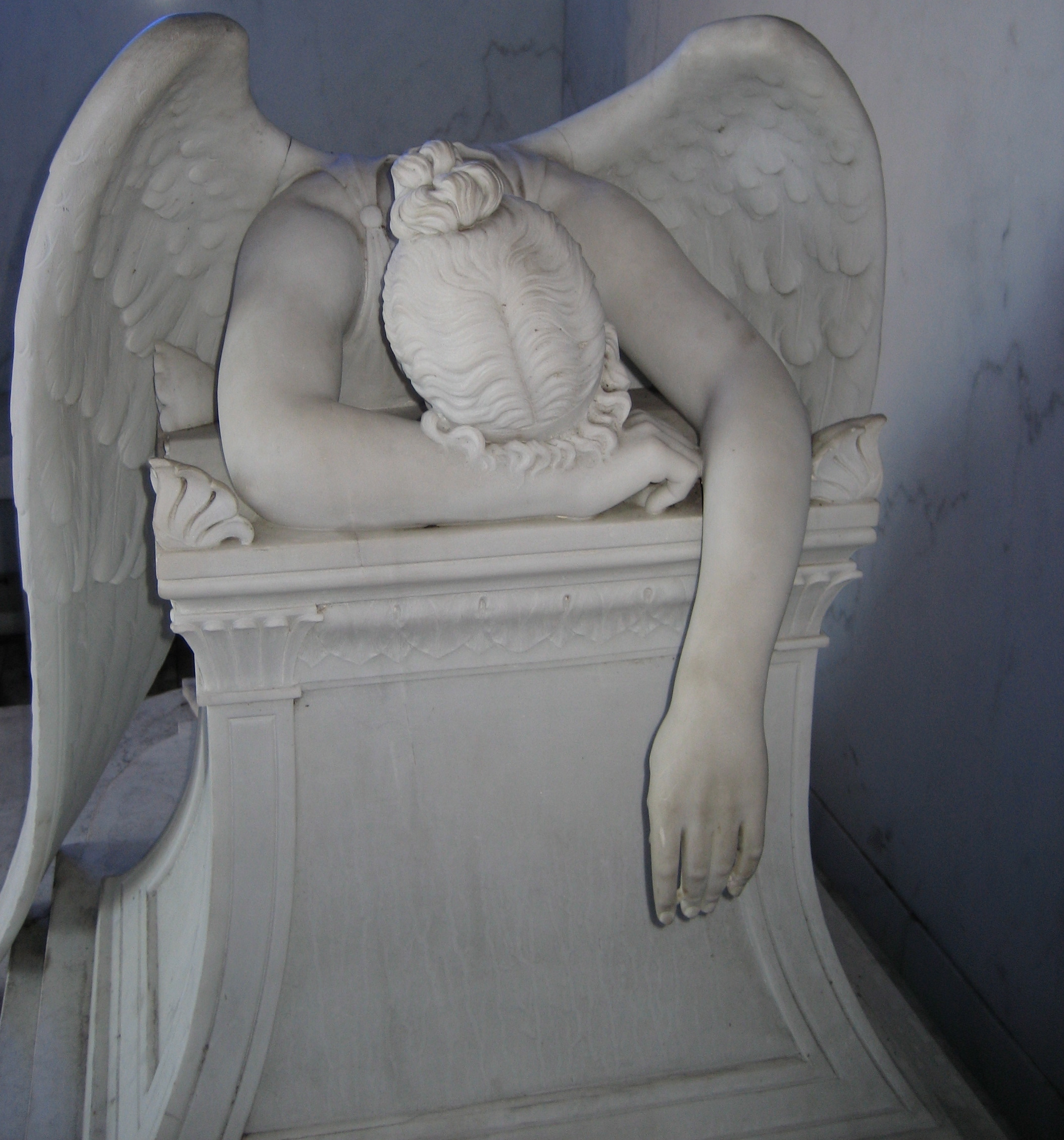
Hyams Monument, Metairie Cemetery, New Orleans

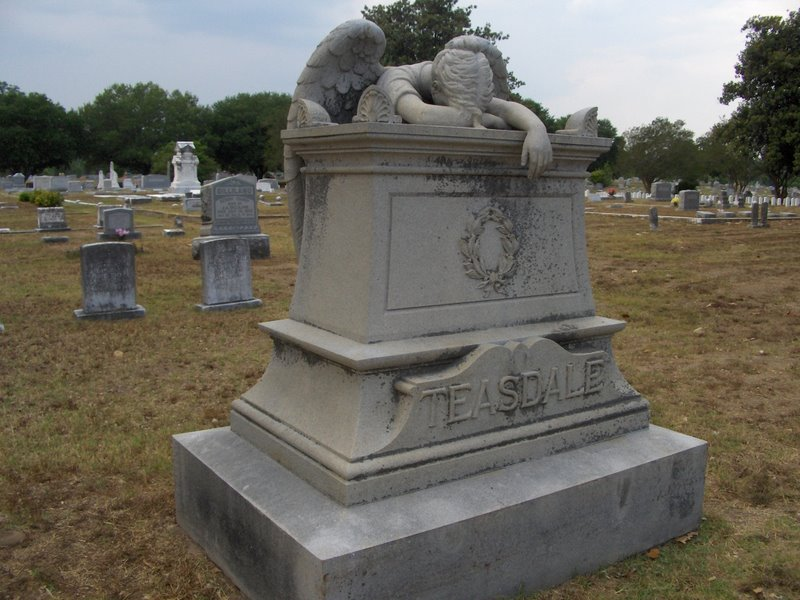
Teasdale Monument, Columbus, Mississippi.

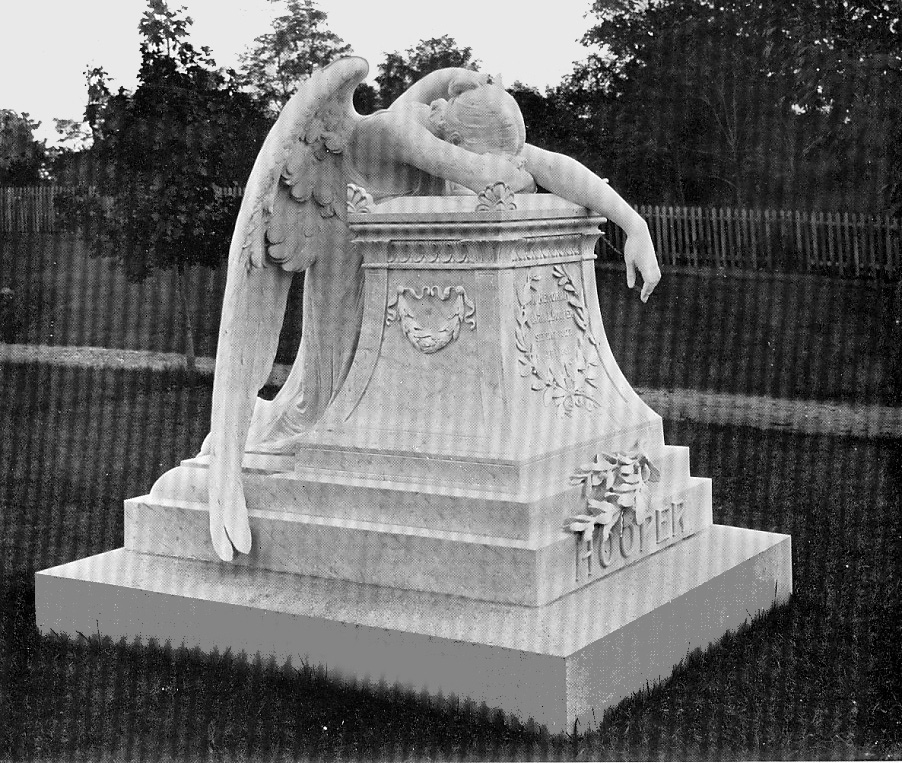
Hooper Memorial (1912), Old Ship Church, Hingham, Massachusetts

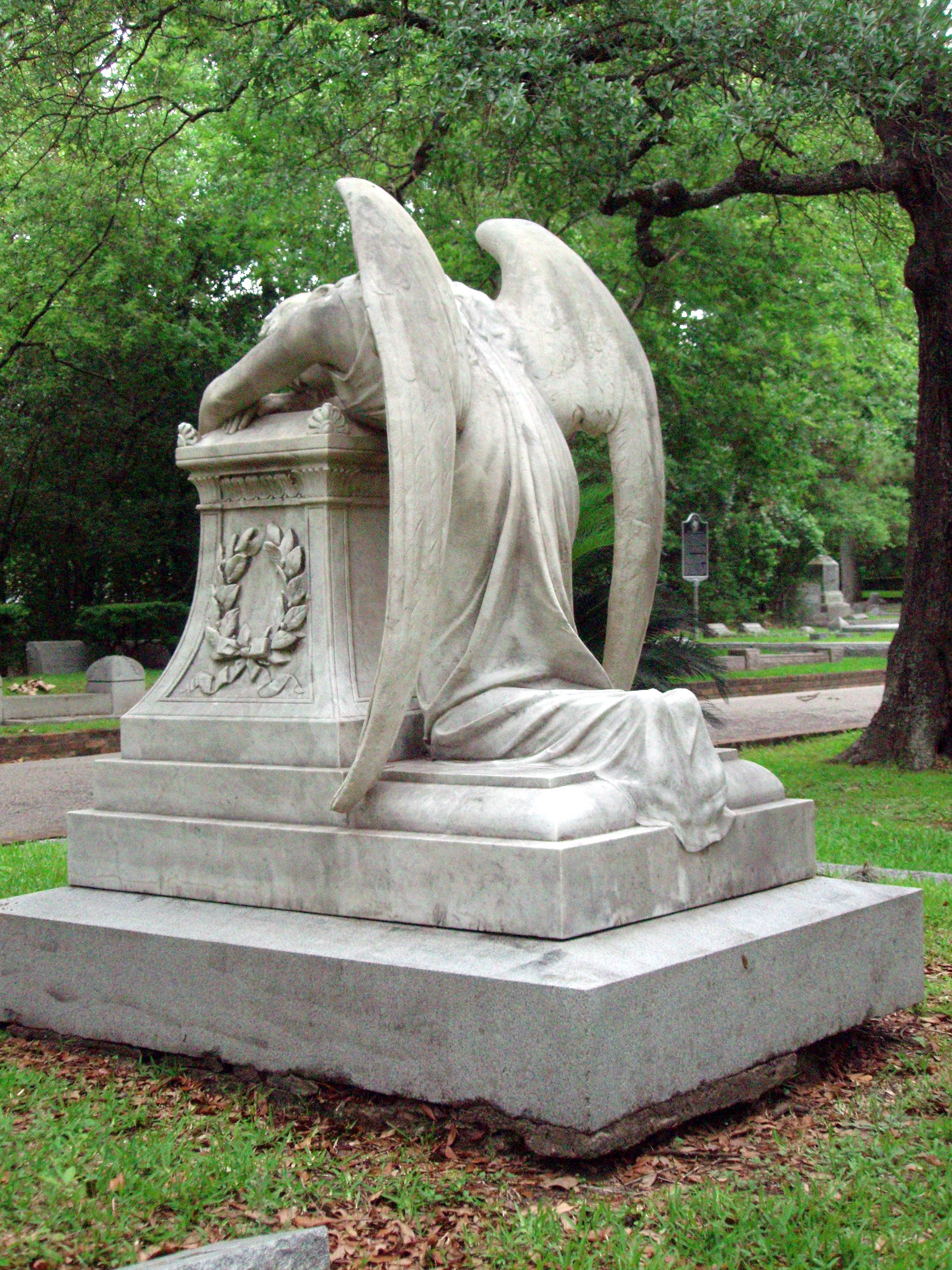
Hill Monument,
Glenwood Cemetery (Houston, Texas)

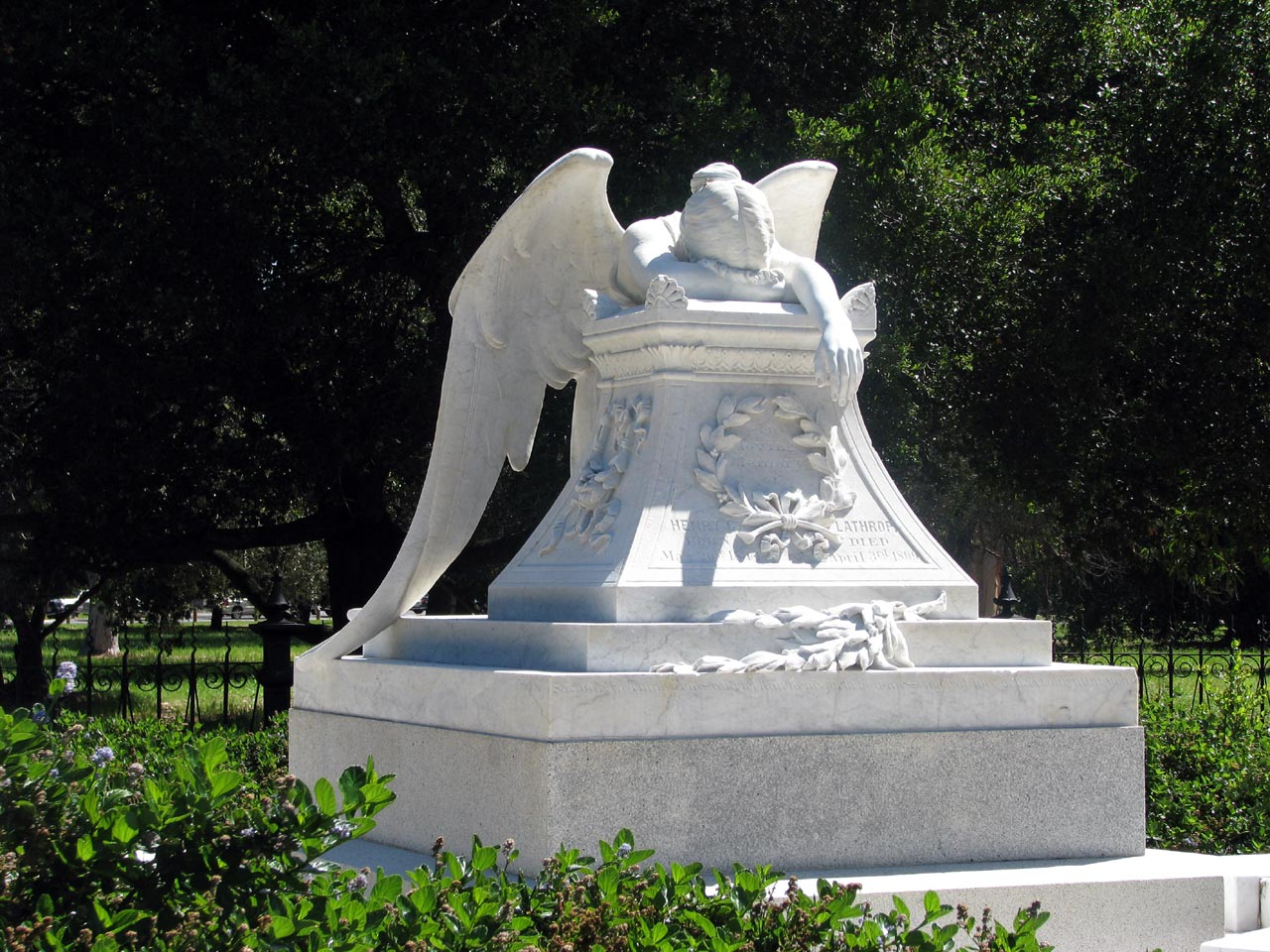
Lathrop Memorial,
Stanford University,
Palo Alto, California

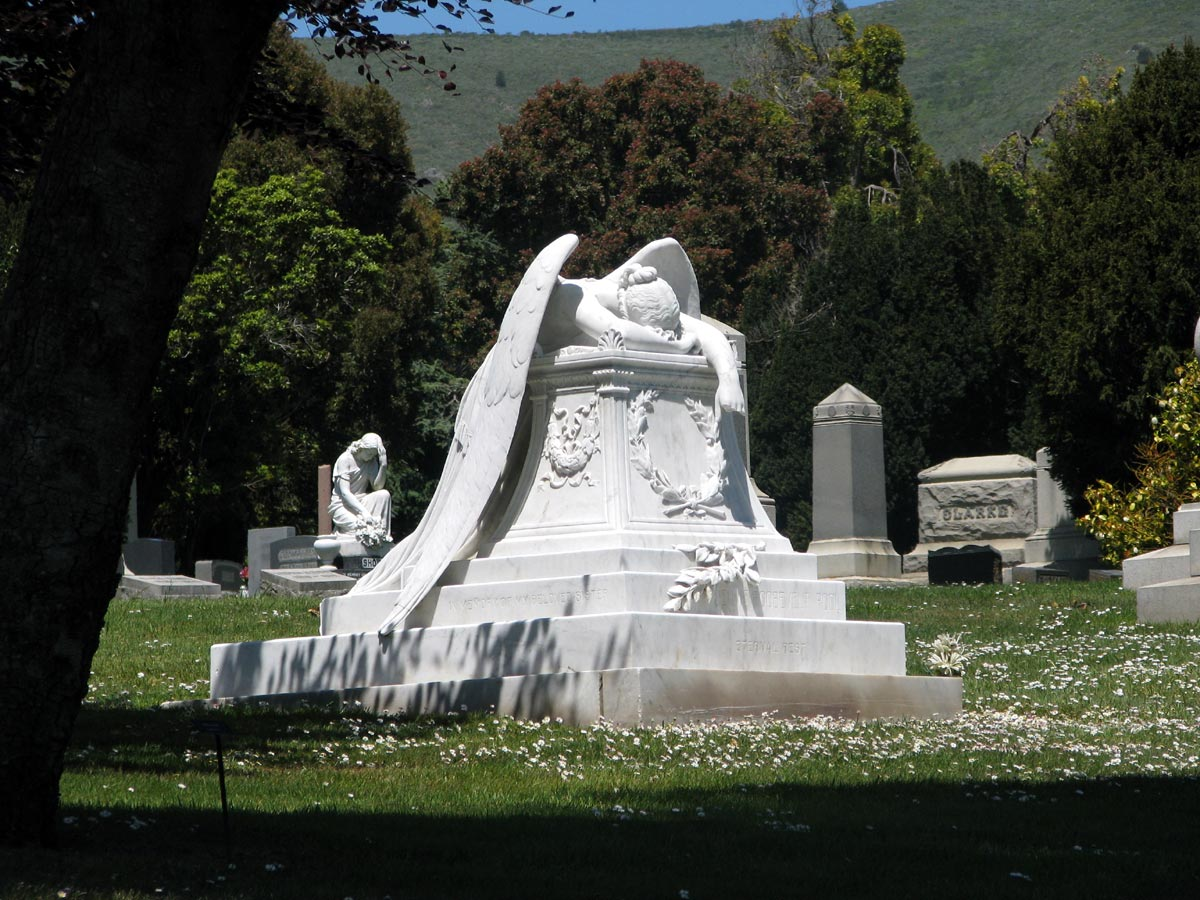
Pool Monument,
Cypress Lawn Memorial Park, Colma, California

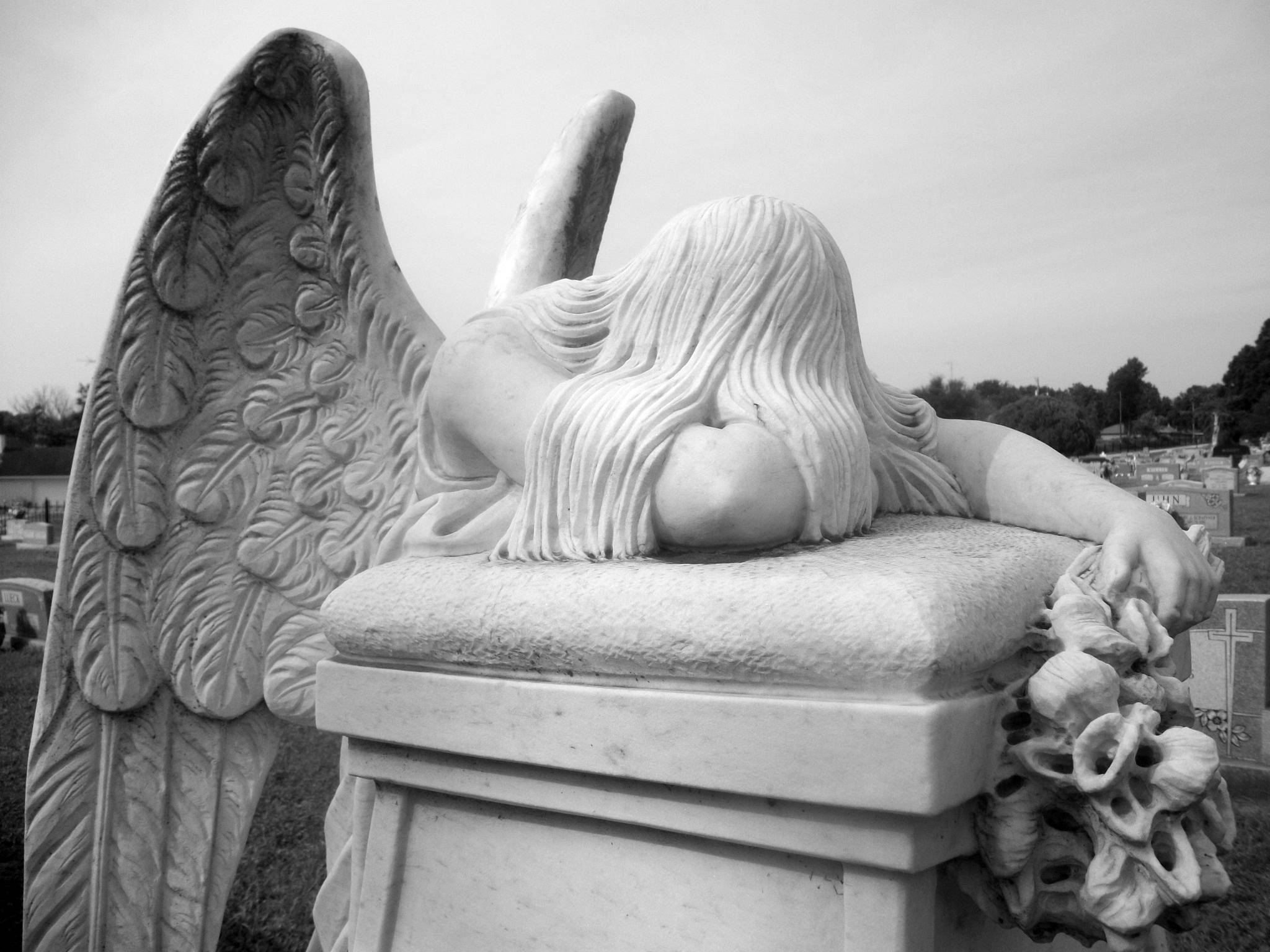
Eissler Monument, Prairie Lea Cemetery, Brenham, Texas. This variation has long flowing hair.

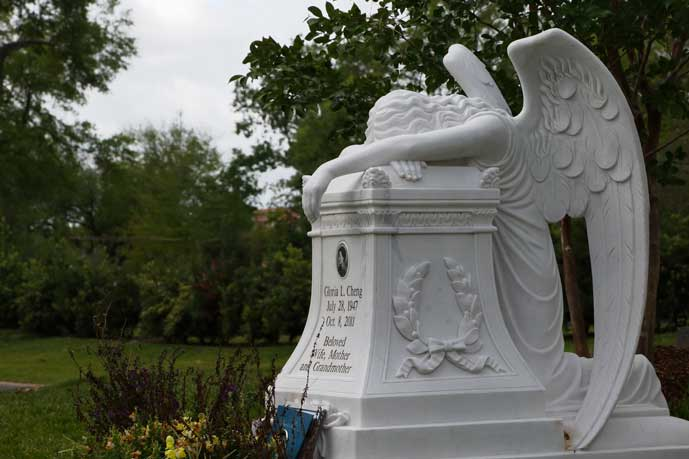
Gloria Cheng Monument, Glenwood Cemetery, Houston, TX

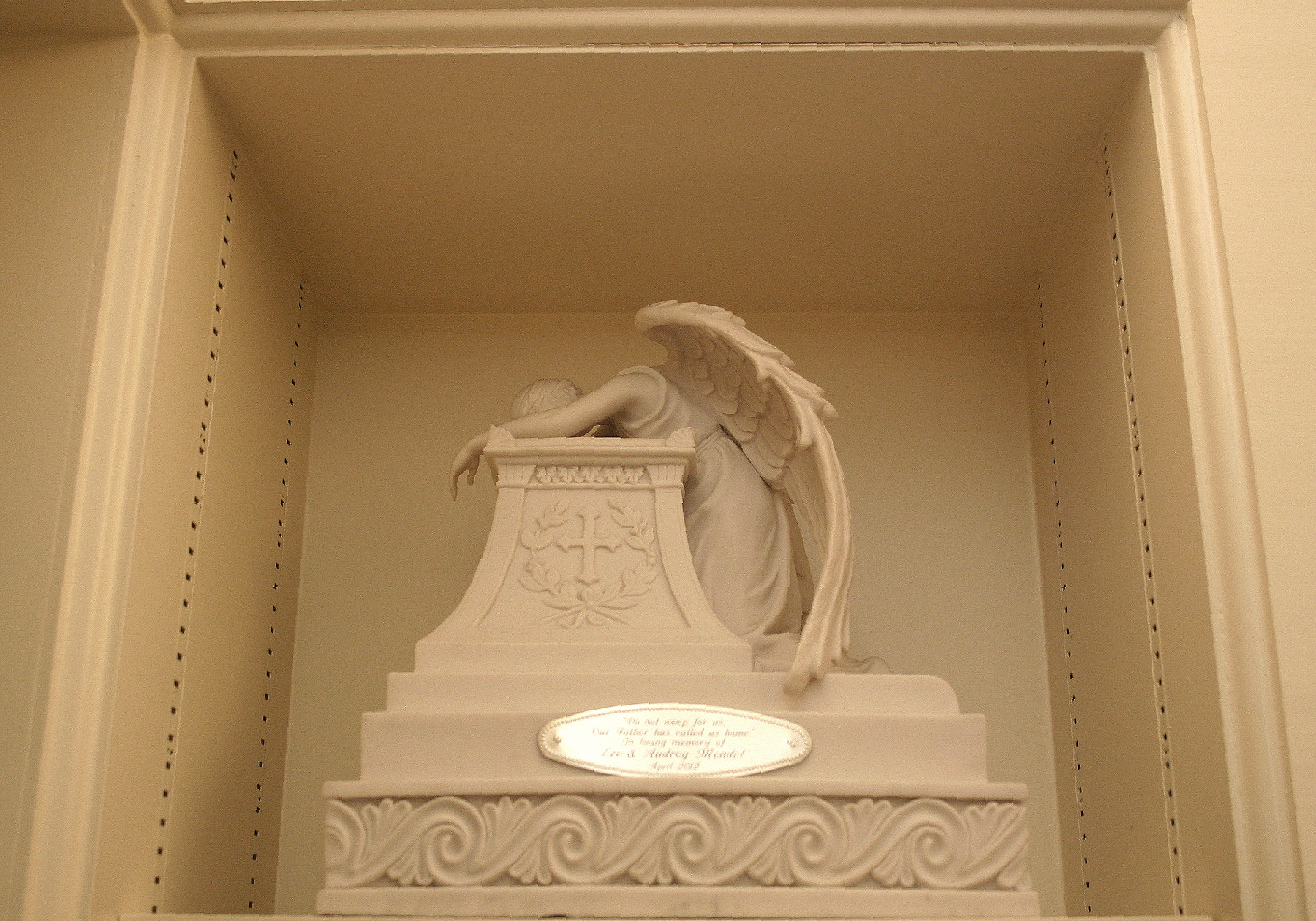
Commercial version, c. 2016
