= William Wetmore Story and His Friends =

Book by Henry James

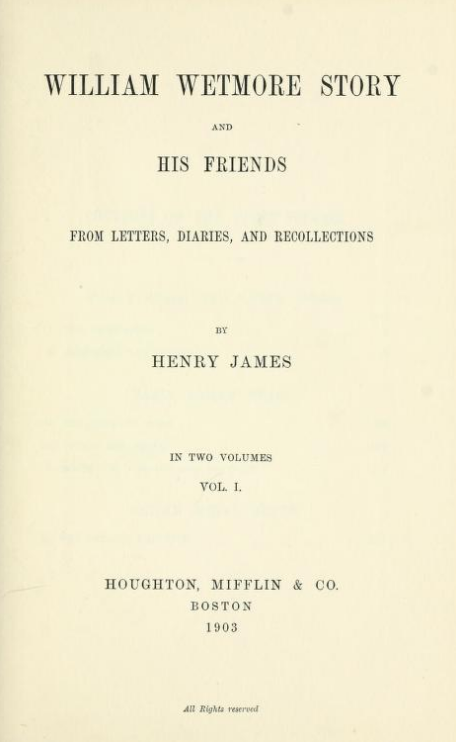
- Title page of the first US edition
- Author: Henry James
- Language: English
- Genre: Biography
- Publisher: William Blackwood and Sons (UK); Houghton Mifflin (US)
- Publication date: 7 October 1903
- Publication place: United Kingdom
- Media type: Print
- Pages: Volume one, 371 volume two, 338

William Wetmore Story and His Friends is a biography of sculptor William Wetmore Story by Henry James, published in 1903. James concentrated on the "friends" of the title, who included Robert Browning, Elizabeth Barrett Browning, James Russell Lowell, and other figures more prominent than Story himself.

== Summary and themes ==
James had met William Wetmore Story in Rome in the 1870s and often enjoyed his hospitality. James didn't take Story very seriously as an artist, though, but regarded him as more of a wealthy dilettante. After Story's death in 1895 his family approached James about writing a biography. James found the project a difficult one because he didn't think there was much to say about Story's own artistic efforts. So he made the book into more of a reminiscence on Italy and the many notable people Story had known. James did discuss Story's most significant works, the statues Cleopatra and the Libyan Sybil.

James quoted from fine letters written to Story by the Brownings and other noteworthy friends. He also worked the Italian background for all it was worth. As James put it in a letter to William Dean Howells: "There is nothing for me but to do a tour de force, or try—leave poor W.W.S. out, practically, and make a little volume on the old Roman, Americo-Roman, Hawthornesque and other bygone days."

== Critical evaluation ==
Critics have generally been kind to this book, perhaps because they realize how difficult it is to write a biography on an insignificant subject. The Encyclopædia Britannica, for instance, calls the book "an entertaining account of Story's life in Rome." James' evocation of old Rome and the Italian countryside has been praised as charming and lovely, much like his essays in Italian Hours.
