= George Peabody =

American-British entrepreneur and philanthropist (1795–1869)

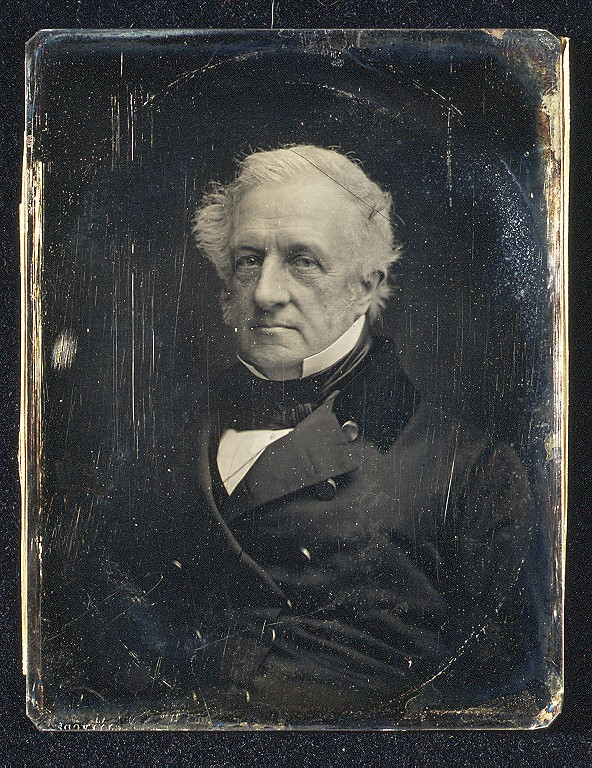
- Peabody in c. 1850
- Born: February 18, 1795; Danvers, Massachusetts, U.S.
- Died: November 4, 1869 (aged 74); No. 80 Eaton Square, London, England
- Resting place: Westminster Abbey, London (1869–1870); Harmony Grove Cemetery, Salem, Massachusetts (since 1870)
- Occupations: Financier; banker; entrepreneur
- Parent(s): Thomas Peabody and Judith Dodge

George Peabody (/ˈpiːbɒdi/; February 18, 1795 – November 4, 1869) was an American financier and philanthropist. He is often considered the father of modern philanthropy.

Born into a poor family in Massachusetts, Peabody went into business in dry goods and later into banking. In 1837 he moved to London (which was then the capital of world finance) where he became the most noted American banker and helped to establish the young country's international credit. Having no son of his own to whom he could pass on his business, Peabody took on Junius Spencer Morgan as a partner in 1854, and their joint business became the global financial services firm J.P. Morgan & Co. after Peabody's 1864 retirement.

In his old age, Peabody won worldwide acclaim for his philanthropy. He founded the Peabody Trust in Britain and the Peabody Institute and George Peabody Library in Baltimore, and was responsible for many other charitable initiatives. For his generosity, he was awarded the Congressional Gold Medal and made a Freeman of the City of London, among many other honors.

== Biography ==
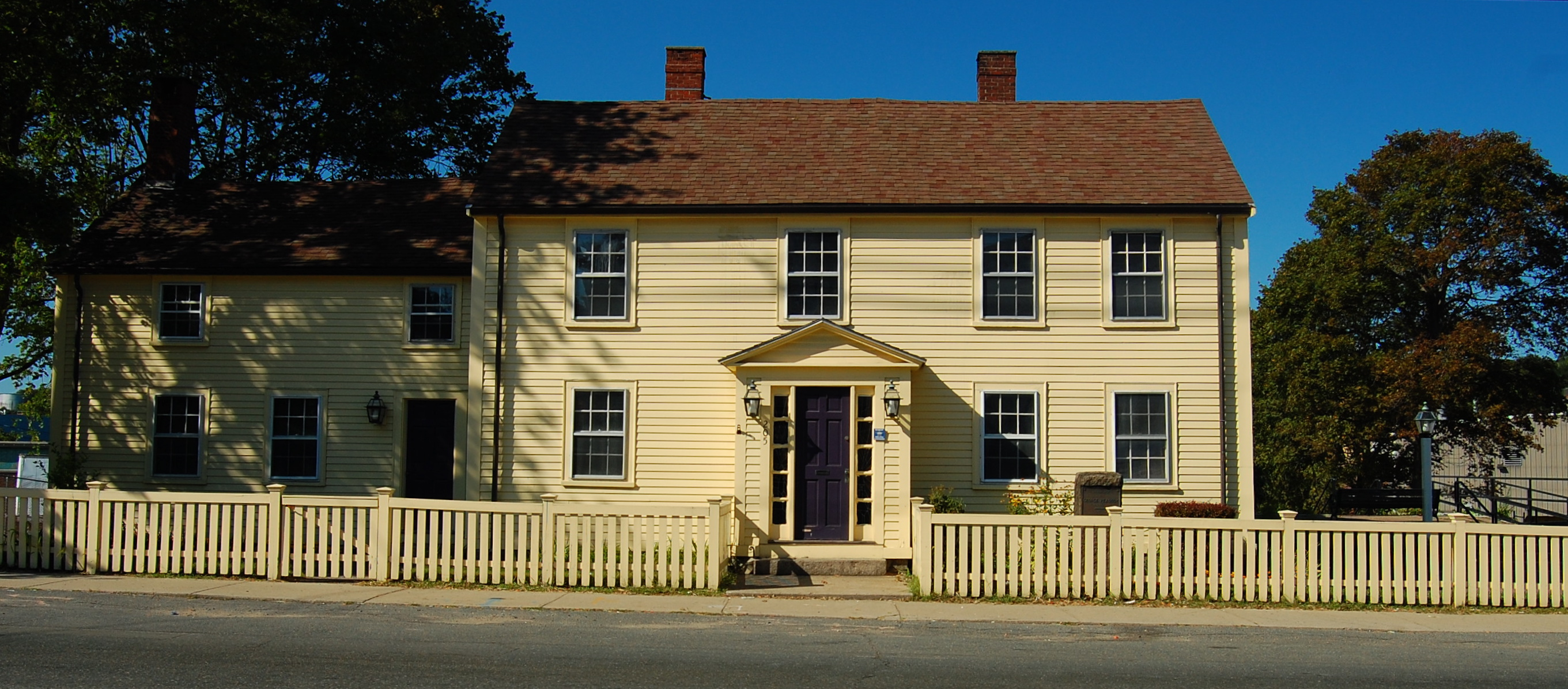
Peabody's birthplace, now the George Peabody House Museum, in Peabody, Massachusetts

Peabody was born in 1795 in what was then the South Parish of Danvers (now Peabody), Massachusetts. His family had Puritan ancestors in the state. As one of seven children in a poor family, George suffered some deprivations during his childhood, and was able to attend school for only a few years. When he was a teenager, his father died, and he worked in his brother's shop to support his widowed mother and six siblings. He later expressed "I have never forgotten and never can forget the great privations of my early years". These factors influenced his later devotion to both thrift and philanthropy.

In 1816, he moved to Baltimore, where he made his career and would live for the next 20 years. He established his residence and office in the old Henry Fite House, and became a businessman and financier.

At that time London, Amsterdam, Paris, and Frankfurt were at the center of international banking and finance. As all international transactions were settled in gold or gold certificates, a developing nation like the United States had to rely upon agents and merchant banks to raise capital through relationships with merchant banking houses in Europe. Only they held the quantity of reserves of capital necessary to extend long-term credit to a developing economy like that of the US.

Peabody first visited England in 1827, seeking to use his firm and his agency to sell American states' bond issues, to raise capital for those states' various programs of "internal improvements" (principally the transportation infrastructure, such as roads, railroads, docks and canals). Over the next decade Peabody made four more trans-Atlantic trips, starting in 1835 and establishing a branch office in Liverpool. Later he established the banking firm of George Peabody & Company (later stylised as J. S. Morgan & Co.) in London. In 1837, he took up permanent residence in London, where he lived for the rest of his life.

In the 1840s, the state of Maryland defaulted on its debt and Peabody, having marketed about half of Maryland's securities to individual investors in Europe, became persona non grata around London. The Times of London noted that while Peabody was an "American gentleman of the most unblemished character", the Reform Club had blackballed him for being a citizen of a country that reneged on its debts. At first, Peabody sent letters to scold Baltimore friends about the need for the state to resume interest payment and rewarded reporters with small gratuities for favourable articles about the state.

At last, in 1845 he conspired with Barings to push Maryland into resuming payment by setting up a political slush fund to spread propaganda for debt resumption and elect legislators who would placate their investors. By means of a secret account, the two firms transferred a thousand pounds sterling to Baltimore and even bribed Daniel Webster, the orator and statesman, to make speeches for debt repayment. Their attempts were successful: pro-resumption Whigs were elected and London bankers started to receive payments. Barings duplicated the same tactics in Pennsylvania. Florida and Mississippi were the most persistent debtors and as such were excluded from Peabody's later philanthropies.

Although Peabody was briefly engaged in 1838 (and later allegedly had a mistress in Brighton, England, who bore him a daughter), he never married. Ron Chernow describes him as "homely", with "a rumpled face ... knobby chin, bulbous nose, side whiskers, and heavy-lidded eyes."

Peabody frequently entertained and provided letters of introduction for American businessmen visiting London, and became known for the Anglo-American dinners he hosted in honor of American diplomats and other worthies, and in celebration of the Fourth of July. In 1851, when the US Congress refused to support the American section at the Great Exhibition at the Crystal Palace, Peabody advanced £3000 (then worth $15,000; equivalent to about $460,000 in 2025 dollars) to improve the exhibit and uphold the reputation of the United States. In 1854, he offended many of his American guests at a Fourth of July dinner when he chose to toast Queen Victoria before US President Franklin Pierce; Pierce's future successor, James Buchanan, then Ambassador to London, left in a huff. At around this time, Peabody began to suffer from rheumatoid arthritis and gout.

In February 1867, on one of several return visits to the United States, and at the height of his financial success, Peabody was suggested by Francis Preston Blair, an old crony of President Andrew Jackson and an active power in the smoldering Democratic Party, as a possible Secretary of the Treasury in the cabinet of President Andrew Johnson. At about the same time, Peabody was also mentioned in newspapers as a future presidential candidate. Peabody described the presidential suggestion as a "kind and complimentary reference", but considered that, at age 72, he was too old for either office.

Coat of arms of George Peabody

== Business ==
While serving as a volunteer in the War of 1812, Peabody met Elisha Riggs, who, in 1814, provided financial backing for what became the wholesale dry goods firm of Riggs, Peabody & Co. The firm specialized in importing dry goods from Britain. Branches were opened in New York and Philadelphia in 1822. Riggs retired in 1829, and the firm became Peabody, Riggs & Co., with the names reversed as Peabody became the senior partner.

Peabody first visited England in 1827 to purchase wares, and to negotiate the sale of American cotton in Lancashire. He subsequently opened a branch office in Liverpool, and British business began to play an increasingly important role in his affairs. He appears to have had some help in establishing himself from Sir William Brown, 1st Baronet, of Richmond Hill and James Brown, sons of another highly-successful Baltimore businessman, the Irishman Alexander Brown (founder of the investment and banking firm of Alex. Brown & Sons in 1801), who managed their father's Liverpool office, which opened in 1810.

In 1837, Peabody took up residence in London, and the following year, he started a banking business trading on his own account. The banking firm of George Peabody and Company was not, however, established until 1851. It was founded to meet the increasing demand for securities issued by the American railroads, and, although Peabody continued to deal in dry goods and other commodities, he increasingly focused his attentions on merchant banking, specializing in financing governments and large companies. The bank rose to become the premier American house in London.

In Peabody's early years in London, American state governments were notorious for defaulting on their debts to British lenders, and as a prominent American financier in London, Peabody often faced scorn for America's poor credit. (On one occasion, he was blackballed from membership in a gentlemen's club.) Peabody joined forces with Barings Bank to lobby American states for debt repayment, particularly his home state of Maryland. The campaign included printing propaganda and bribing clergy and politicians, most notably Senator Daniel Webster. Peabody made a significant profit when Maryland, Pennsylvania and other states resumed payments, having previously bought up state bonds at a low cost. Encyclopædia Britannica cites him as having "helped establish U.S. credit abroad."

Peabody took Junius Spencer Morgan (father of J. P. Morgan) into partnership in 1854 to form Peabody, Morgan & Co., and the two financiers worked together until Peabody's retirement in 1864; Morgan had effective control of the business from 1859 on. During the run on the banks of 1857, Peabody had to ask the Bank of England for a loan of £800,000; although rivals tried to force the bank out of business, it managed to emerge with its credit intact.

Following this crisis, Peabody began to retire from active business, and in 1864, retired fully (taking much of his capital, amounting to over $10,000,000, or £2,000,000). Peabody, Morgan & Co. then took the name J.S. Morgan & Co. The former UK merchant bank Morgan Grenfell (now part of Deutsche Bank), international universal bank JPMorgan Chase and investment bank Morgan Stanley can all trace their roots to Peabody's bank.

== Philanthropy ==
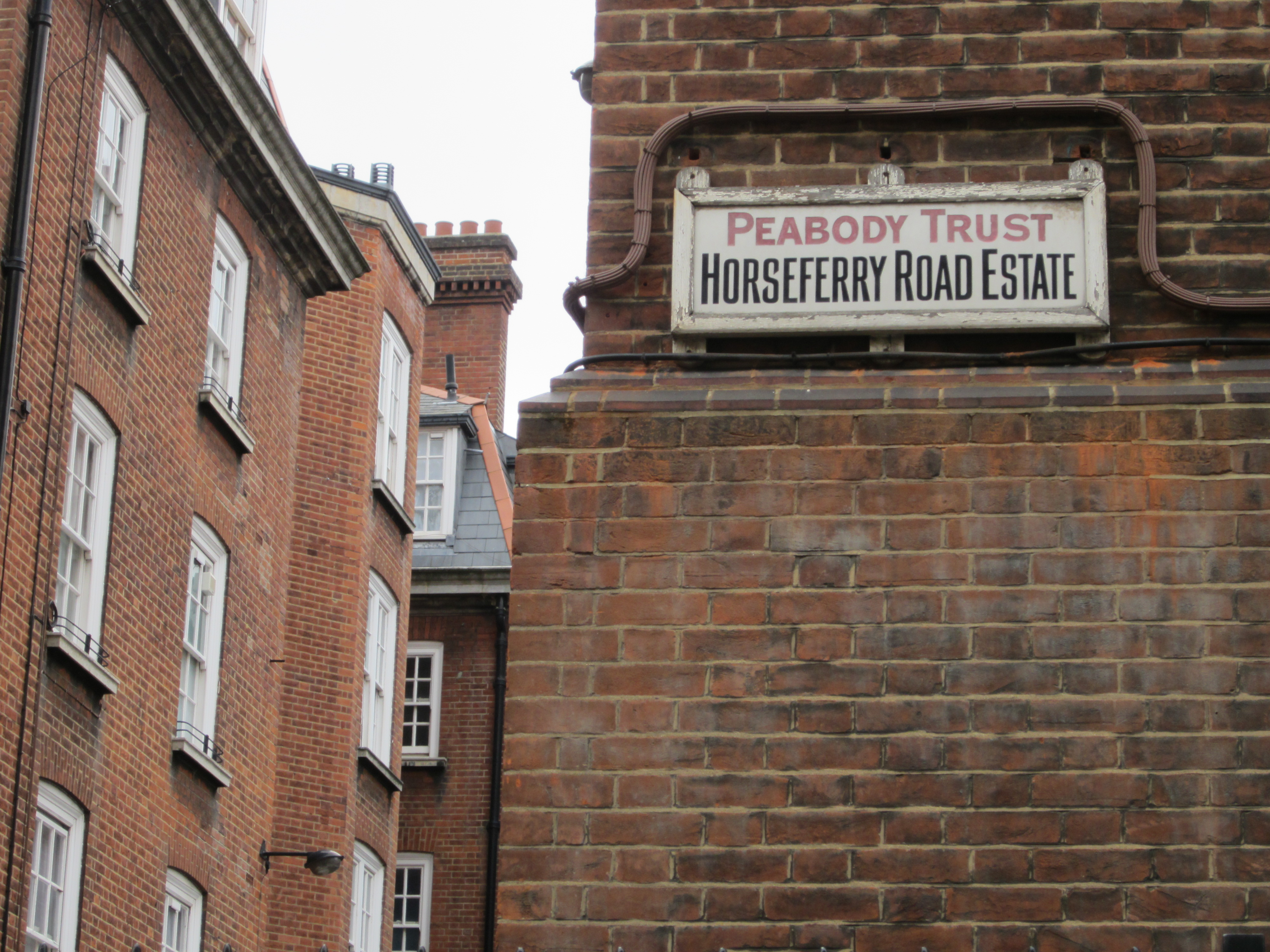
The Peabody Trust continues to provide cheap housing in central London. This sign marks the Horseferry Road Estate in Westminster.

Though thrifty, even miserly with his employees and relatives, Peabody gave generously to public causes. He became the acknowledged father of modern philanthropy, having established the practice later followed by Johns Hopkins, Andrew Carnegie, John D. Rockefeller and Bill Gates. In the United States, his philanthropy largely took the form of educational initiatives. In Britain, it took the form of providing housing for the poor.

In America, Peabody founded and supported numerous institutions in New England, the South, and elsewhere. In 1867–68, he established the Peabody Education Fund with $3.5 million to "encourage the intellectual, moral, and industrial education of the destitute children of the Southern States." His grandest beneficence, however, was to Baltimore, the city in which he achieved his earliest success.

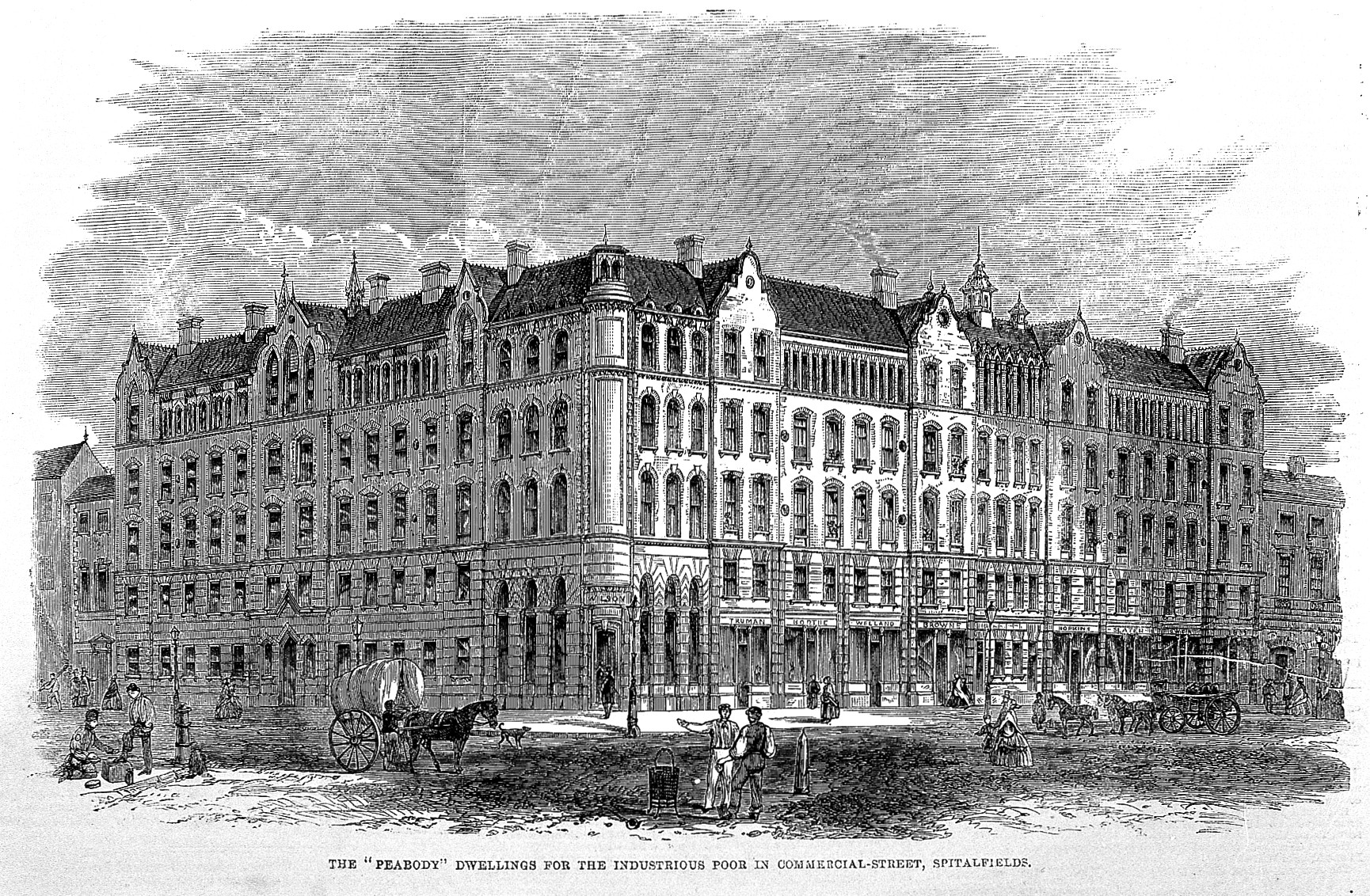
The first block of Peabody dwellings in Commercial Street, Spitalfields, London. A wood-engraving published in The Illustrated London News in 1863, shortly before the building opened.

In April 1862, Peabody established the Peabody Donation Fund, which continues to this day as the Peabody Trust, to provide housing of decent quality for the "artisans and labouring poor of London". The trust's first dwellings, designed by H. A. Darbishire in a Jacobethan style, were opened in Commercial Street, Spitalfields in February 1864.

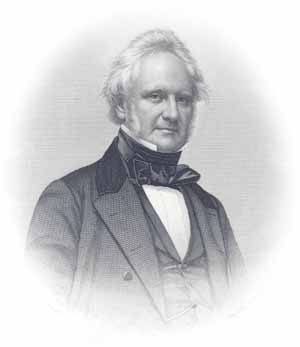
George Peabody

George Peabody provided benefactions of well over $8 million ($240,000,000 in 2023 dollars), most of them in his lifetime.

Some of the organizations which have been confirmed as recipients of Peabody's funds include:

- 1852, The Peabody Institute (now the Peabody Institute Library), Peabody, Mass: $217,000
- 1856, The Peabody Institute, Danvers, Mass (now the Peabody Institute Library of Danvers): $100,000
- 1857, The Peabody Institute (now the Peabody Institute of the Johns Hopkins University), Baltimore: $1,400,000. By including a complex involving a library, an academy of music, and an art gallery, his goal was to promote the moral, intellectual, and artistic opportunities for the people of Baltimore.
- 1862, The Peabody Donation Fund, London: $2,500,000
- 1866, The Peabody Museum of Archaeology and Ethnology, Harvard University: $150,000
- 1866, The Peabody Museum of Natural History, Yale University: $150,000 (at the suggestion of his nephew Othniel Charles Marsh, son of his younger sister Mary Peabody, and America's first professor of paleontology)
- 1866, The Georgetown Peabody Library, the public library of Georgetown, Massachusetts
- 1866, The Thetford Public Library in Thetford, Vermont: $5,000
- 1867, The Peabody Academy of Science, Salem, Mass: $140,000 (now the Peabody Essex Museum)
- 1867, The Peabody Institute, Georgetown, District of Columbia: $15,000 (today the Peabody Room, Georgetown Branch, DC Public Library)
- 1867, Peabody Education Fund: $2,000,000
- 1875, George Peabody College for Teachers, now the Peabody College of Vanderbilt University, Nashville, Tennessee. The funding came from the Peabody Education Fund
- 1877, Peabody High School, Trenton, Tennessee, established with funds provided by Peabody
- 1901, The Peabody Memorial Library, Sam Houston State University, Texas
- 1913, George Peabody Building, University of Mississippi
- 1913, Peabody Hall, housing the Department of Curriculum and Instruction, University of Arkansas: $40,000
- 1913, Peabody Hall, housing the School of Education (now Philosophy and Religion), University of Georgia: $40,000
- 1913, Peabody Hall, housing the College for Teachers (now part of Criser Student Services Center), University of Florida: $40,000
- Peabody Hall, housing the college of Human Science and Education, Louisiana State University
- 1914, Peabody Hall, housing the Curry Memorial School of Education (now Office of the Dean of Students and the Office of Admission), University of Virginia

== Death ==
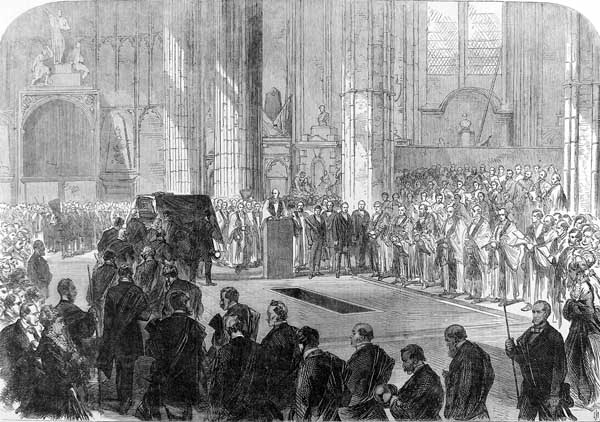
Peabody's funeral in Westminster Abbey

Peabody died in London on November 4, 1869, aged 74, at the house of his friend Sir Curtis Lampson. At the request of the Dean of Westminster, and with the approval of Queen Victoria, he was given a funeral and temporary grave in Westminster Abbey.

His will provided that he be buried in the town of his birth, South Danvers, Massachusetts (now Peabody). Prime Minister William Ewart Gladstone arranged for Peabody's remains to be returned to America on HMS Monarch, the newest and largest ship in the Royal Navy, arriving at Portland, Maine, where they were received by US Admiral David Farragut. He was buried in Harmony Grove Cemetery, in Salem, Massachusetts, on February 8, 1870. Peabody's death and the pair of funerals were international news, through the newly completed trans-Atlantic underwater telegraph cable. Hundreds of people participated in the ceremonies and thousands more attended or observed.

== Impact on American philanthropy ==
Historian Roderick Nash argues that Peabody made his millions quietly in groceries and real estate, while contemporary millionaires were building more visible empires in oil, iron, land, and especially railroads. As a disciple of Benjamin Franklin, Peabody combined hard work with frugality, punctuality, and a strong public spirit. Peabody was a pioneer, whose success in philanthropy set a new standard for American millionaires. By contrast, philanthropy in Europe was more typically dispensed by aristocratic families with inherited landed wealth, which built palaces and museums that were eventually opened to the public. The American way was for the self-made millionaires to become self-made philanthropists, a model perfected in the next generation by Andrew Carnegie (1835–1919) and John D. Rockefeller (1839–1937). They agreed with Peabody that riches produced a duty to give most of it back to the community through specialized permanent foundations.

Peabody was especially imaginative, and relied on his own memories of poverty and self-education to introduce new ways to educate and culturally enrich the next generation of poor youth, and thereby promote greater equality in American society. Jacksonian Democracy promoted equality in politics; he promoted equality and culture through libraries, schools, museums, and colleges. He rejected doling out cash to the poor as a waste of money in comparison to building permanent institutions that produced a steady stream of benefits. His last great benefaction was the Peabody Education Fund, which had a dramatic impact in improving Southern public schools. It was the first major philanthropic institution that gave large sums to poor blacks on the same terms as whites, albeit within the limits of racial segregation. Even more important was the institutional framework that Peabody devised, of a permanent professional foundation run by experts in philanthropy, who were guided by and indeed invented the best practices of the day.

== Recognition and commemoration ==
Peabody's philanthropy won him many admirers in his old age. He was praised by European contemporaries such as Prime Minister William Ewart Gladstone and author Victor Hugo, and Queen Victoria offered him a baronetcy, which he declined.

In 1854, the Arctic explorer Elisha Kane named the waterway off the north-west coast of Greenland Peabody Bay, in honor of Peabody, who had funded his expedition. The waterway was later renamed the Kane Basin, but Peabody Bay survives as the name of a smaller bay at the eastern side of the basin.

On July 10, 1862, he was made a Freeman of the City of London, the motion being proposed by Charles Reed in recognition of his financial contribution to London's poor. He became the first of only two Americans (the other being Dwight D. Eisenhower) to receive the award. On March 16, 1867, he was awarded the United States Congressional Gold Medal, an honorary doctorate of laws by Harvard University, and an honorary doctorate in civil law by Oxford University. On March 24, 1867, Peabody was elected a member of the American Antiquarian Society.

Peabody's birthplace, South Danvers, Massachusetts, changed its name in 1868 to the town (now city) of Peabody, in his honor. In 1869, the Peabody Hotel in Memphis, Tennessee, was named in his memory. A number of elementary and high schools in the United States are named after Peabody.

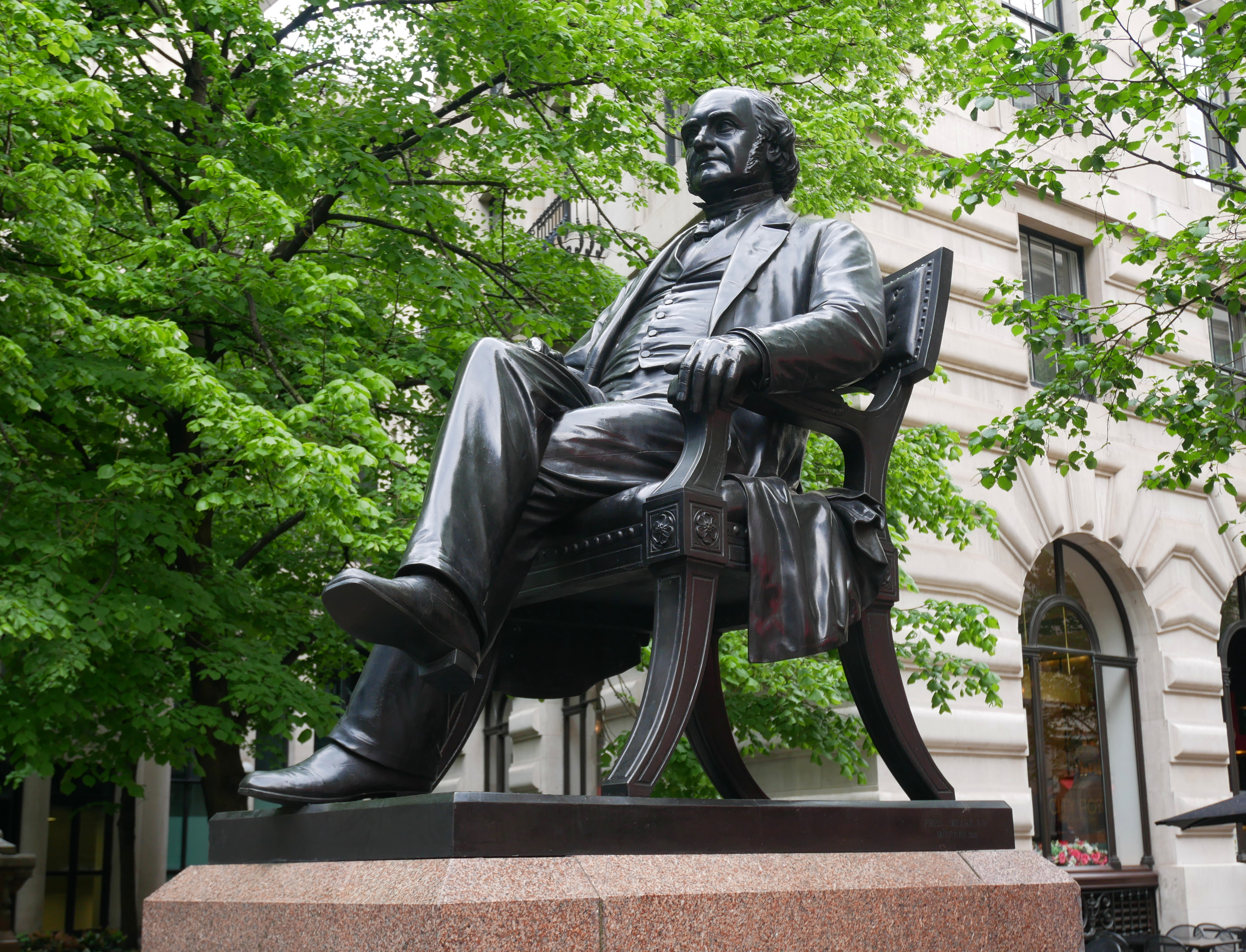
A statue of George Peabody was installed in the City of London in 1869, a few months before Peabody's death.

A statue sculpted by William Wetmore Story stands behind the Royal Exchange in the City of London, unveiled by the Prince of Wales in July 1869: Peabody himself was too unwell to attend the ceremony, and died less than four months later. A replica of the same statue, erected in 1890, stands next to the Peabody Institute, in Mount Vernon Park, part of the Mount Vernon neighborhood of Baltimore, Maryland.

In 1900, Peabody was one of the first 29 honorees to be elected to the Hall of Fame for Great Americans, located on what was then the campus of New York University (and is now that of Bronx Community College), at University Heights, New York.

His birthplace at 205 Washington Street in the City of Peabody is now operated and preserved as the George Peabody House Museum, a museum dedicated to interpreting his life and legacy. There is a blue plaque on the house where he died in London, No. 80 Eaton Square, Belgravia, erected in 1976.

On March 16, 2018, Google honored Peabody with a Google Doodle on the 151st anniversary of Peabody being awarded the Congressional Gold Medal. The mural reproduced in the Google Doodle is physically located within the lunchroom of the George Peabody Elementary School in San Francisco.

The Georgetown Neighborhood Library in Washington, D.C., houses the Peabody Room, named after the original neighborhood Peabody Library founded by Peabody. The Peabody Room contains historical information about the Georgetown neighborhood.

== See also ==
- Philanthropy in the United States
