= Peabody Museum =

The Peabody Museum can refer to:

- George Peabody House Museum, a historic house museum in Peabody, Massachusetts
- Peabody Essex Museum, an art museum in Salem, Massachusetts
- Peabody Historical Library Museum in Peabody, Kansas
- Peabody Leather Museum in Peabody, Massachusetts
- Peabody Museum of Archaeology and Ethnology at Harvard University
- Peabody Museum of Natural History at Yale University
- Peabody Museum of Salem in Salem, Massachusetts, now part of the Peabody Essex Museum
- Robert S. Peabody Museum of Archaeology, former name of the Robert S. Peabody Institute of Archaeology in Andover, Massachusetts
