= George Peabody (sculpture) =

Statue in Baltimore, Maryland U.S.

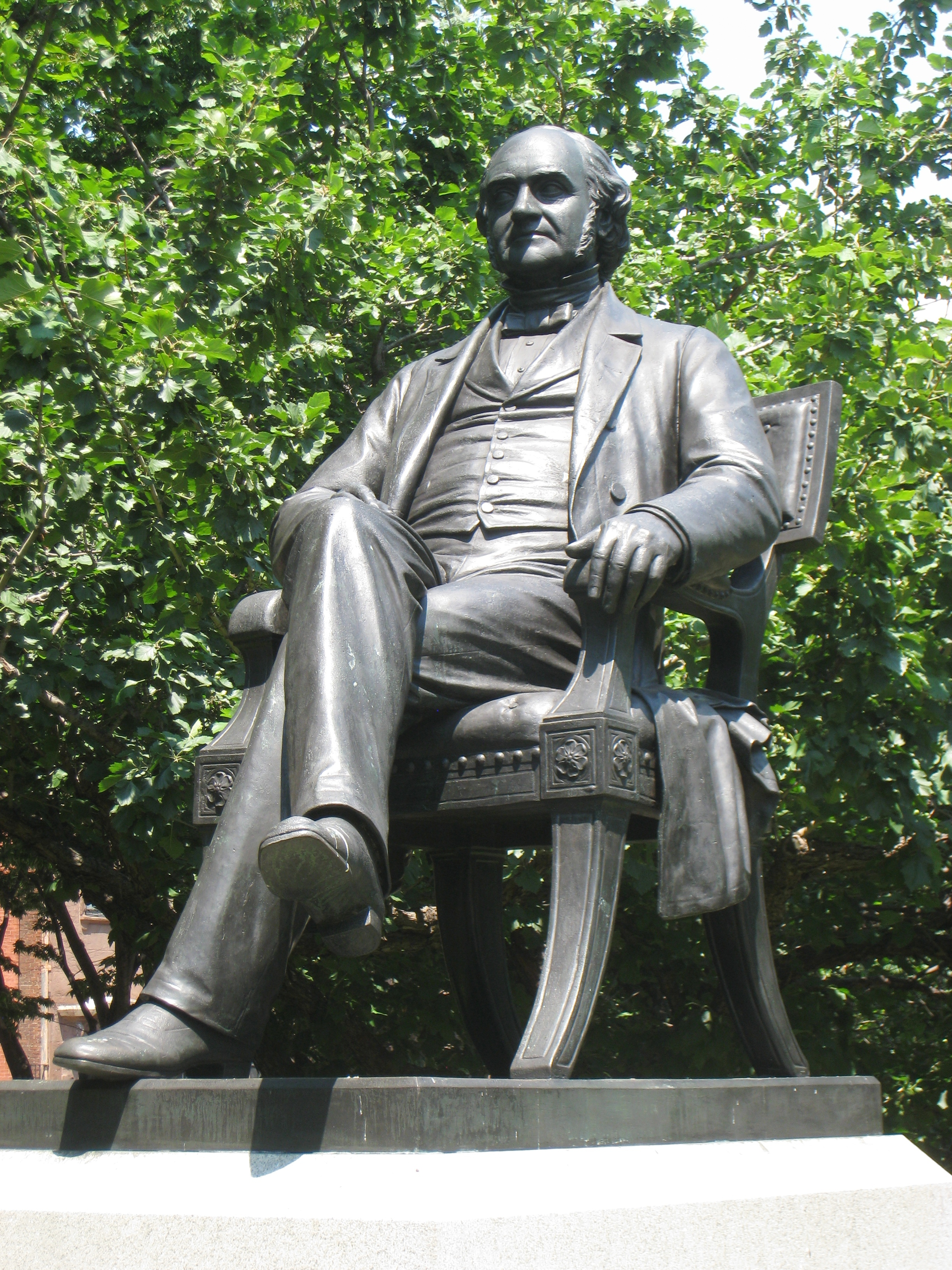
- Artist: William Wetmore Story
- Year: 1869
- Medium: Bronze
- Dimensions: 210 cm × 100 cm × 160 cm (84 in × 40 in × 64 in)
- Location: Baltimore, Maryland; 39°17′51.2″N 76°36′54.14″W
- Owner: City of Baltimore

George Peabody is a bronze statue of George Peabody (1795–1869), by William Wetmore Story. The bronze, cast in Rome at Alessandro Nelli's foundry, is located in the east garden of Mount Vernon Place, Baltimore. It is a replica of the statue of George Peabody in the City of London that was installed in 1869.

It was dedicated on April 7, 1890.

== Inscriptions ==
The inscriptions read:

(Sculpture, bronze base, back proper right side of figure:)

W.Story.Roma
Fond.Nelli.Roma.

(Plinth, bronze plaque on back:)

This statue presented to the

city of Baltimore
April 7, 1890 by
Robert Garrett
1847–1896
President of Baltimore and Ohio Railroad

1884–1887.

A signed founder's mark appears.

== London statue ==
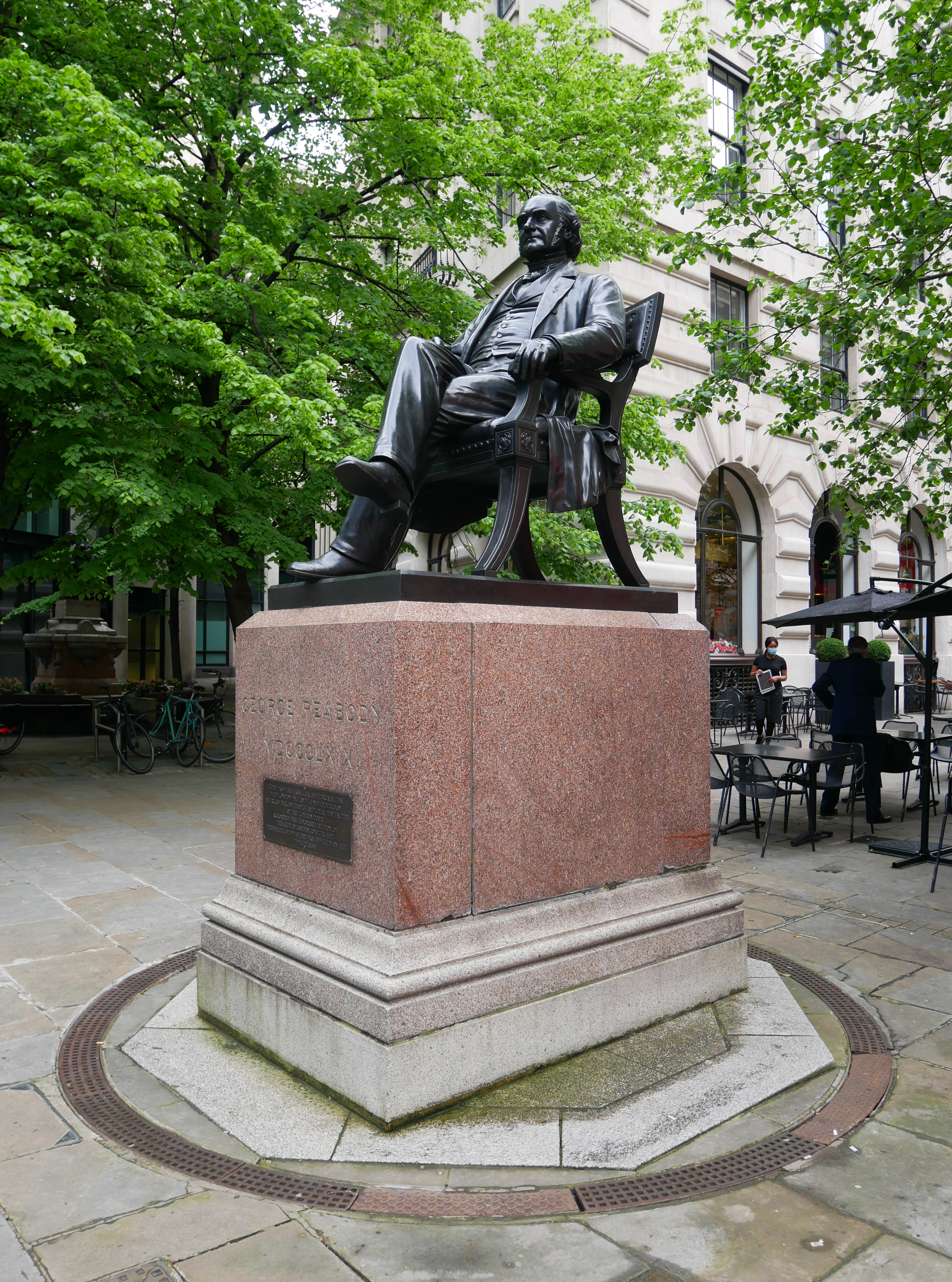
The original statue by the Royal Exchange, London

The statue is a replica of the statue behind the Royal Exchange in the City of London, executed between 1867 and 1869, and unveiled in July 1869 shortly before Peabody's death.

== See also ==
- List of public art in Baltimore
- Fort McHenry
