= Peabody High School =

Peabody High School may refer to

in the United States

- Peabody High School (Milledgeville, Georgia), defunct girls public school in Milledgeville, Georgia
- Peabody High School (Pennsylvania) in Pittsburgh, Pennsylvania, 1911-2011
- Peabody High School (Tennessee)
- Peabody Magnet High School in Alexandria, Louisiana
- Peabody-Burns Junior/Senior High School in Peabody, Kansas
- Peabody Veterans Memorial High School in Peabody, Massachusetts
- Peabody School (Eastman, Georgia)

== See also ==
- Peabody Elementary School (disambiguation)
- Peabody School (disambiguation)
