= Peabody School =

Peabody School may refer to:

- Peabody Building of the Peabody-Williams School, Petersburg, VA, listed on the NRHP in Virginia
- Peabody College for Teachers, Nashville, TN, listed on the NRHP in Tennessee
- Peabody Demonstration School, Nashville, TN
- Peabody School (Charlottesville, Virginia)
- Peabody School (Eastman, Georgia), listed on the NRHP in Georgia
- Peabody School (Haverhill, Massachusetts), listed on the NRHP in Massachusetts
- Little Rock Central High School (formerly Peabody School (1890–1905)), Little Rock, Arkansas

== See also ==
- Peabody Elementary School (disambiguation)
- Peabody High School (disambiguation)
- Peabody Institute, Johns Hopkins University, a conservatory and university-preparatory school in Baltimore, Maryland,
