= National Register of Historic Places listings in Dodge County, Georgia =

This is a list of properties and districts in Dodge County, Georgia that are listed on the National Register of Historic Places (NRHP).

This National Park Service list is complete through NPS recent listings posted March 21, 2025.

== Current listings ==
	Name on the Register	Image	Date listed	Location	City or town	Description
1	Dodge County Courthouse	Dodge County Courthouse	September 18, 1980 (#80001012)	Courthouse Sq. 32°12′04″N 83°10′34″W	Eastman	Built in 1908
2	Dodge County Jail	Dodge County Jail	May 22, 2013 (#13000292)	5100 Courthouse Cir. 32°12′06″N 83°10′32″W	Eastman	Built in 1897, listed as a place in peril
3	Eastman Bus Station	Eastman Bus Station	May 30, 2002 (#02000566)	305 College St. 32°11′43″N 83°10′31″W	Eastman	Built in 1945-46
4	William Pitt Eastman House	William Pitt Eastman House	July 7, 1995 (#95000824)	407 Eastman Way; 32°12′02″N 83°10′50″W	Eastman	Built in 1872
5	Peabody School	Peabody School	November 20, 2004 (#04001238)	Herman Ave. 32°11′28″N 83°10′48″W	Eastman	Built in 1938
6	Williamson Mausoleum at Orphans Cemetery	Williamson Mausoleum at Orphans Cemetery	November 7, 1997 (#97001331)	Orphans Cemetery Rd., jct. of US 23 and US 341; 32°12′24″N 83°13′00″W	Eastman	Erected in 1912
