= William Pitt Eastman House =

Historic house in Georgia, United States

- U.S. National Register of Historic Places
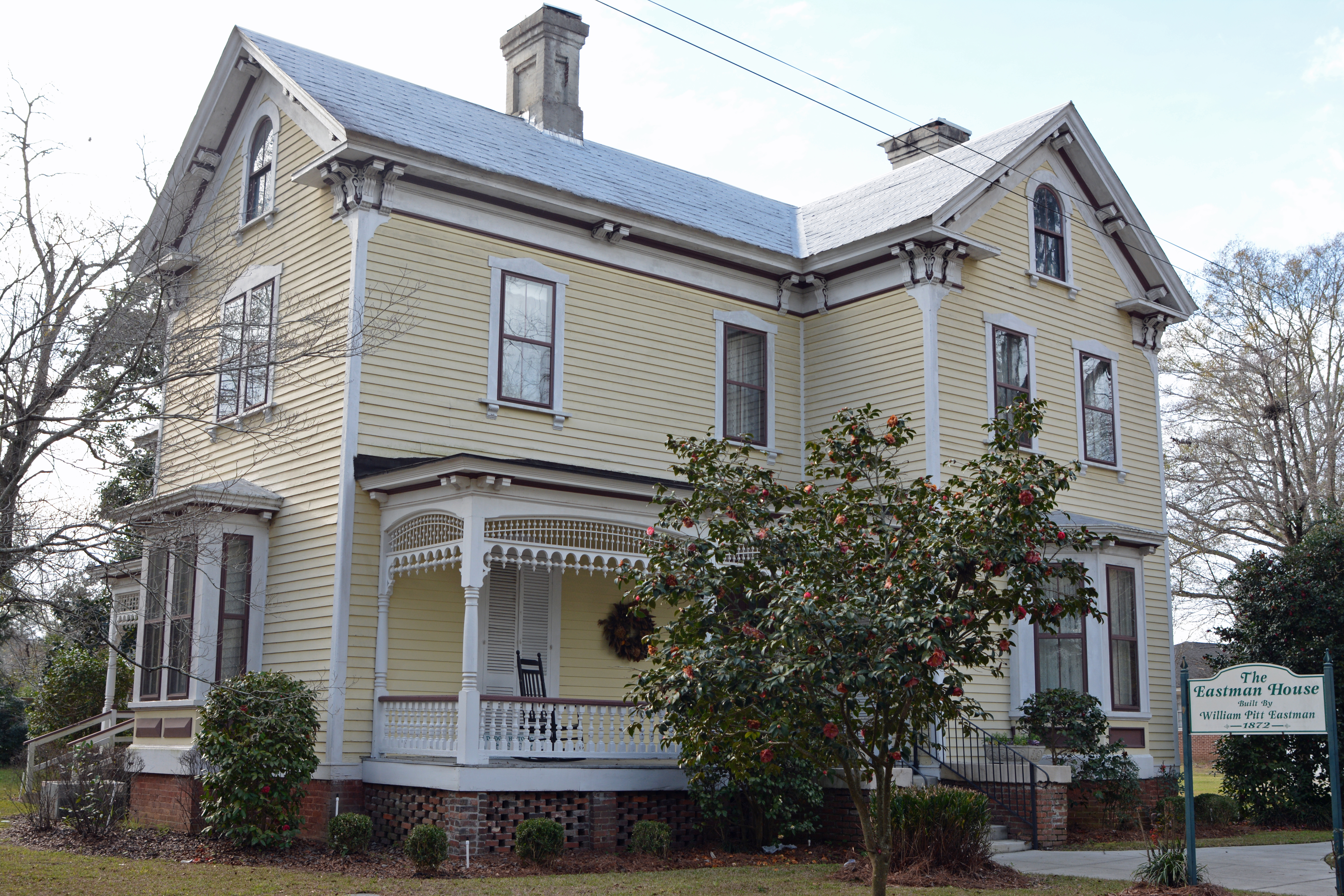

- Location within Georgia
- Location: 407 Eastman Way, Eastman, Georgia
- Coordinates: 32.20065°N 83.18058°W
- Area: 1 acre (0.40 ha)
- Built: 1912
- Architect: Russell, J. H.
- Architectural style: Italianate, Folk Victorian
- NRHP reference No.: 95000824
- Added to NRHP: July 7, 1995

The William Pitt Eastman House was built in Eastman, Georgia by William Pitt Eastman in 1872. Eastman was the organizer of the Georgia Land and Lumber Company and the city is named after him. The house is the oldest one in the city and is a well-preserved example of late Victorian architecture. The Dodge County Historical Society now owns the house and tours are available by appointment. The house was added to the National Register of Historic Places on July 7, 1995.

== See also ==
- National Register of Historic Places listings in Dodge County, Georgia
