= Statue of George Peabody =

Statue in the City of London

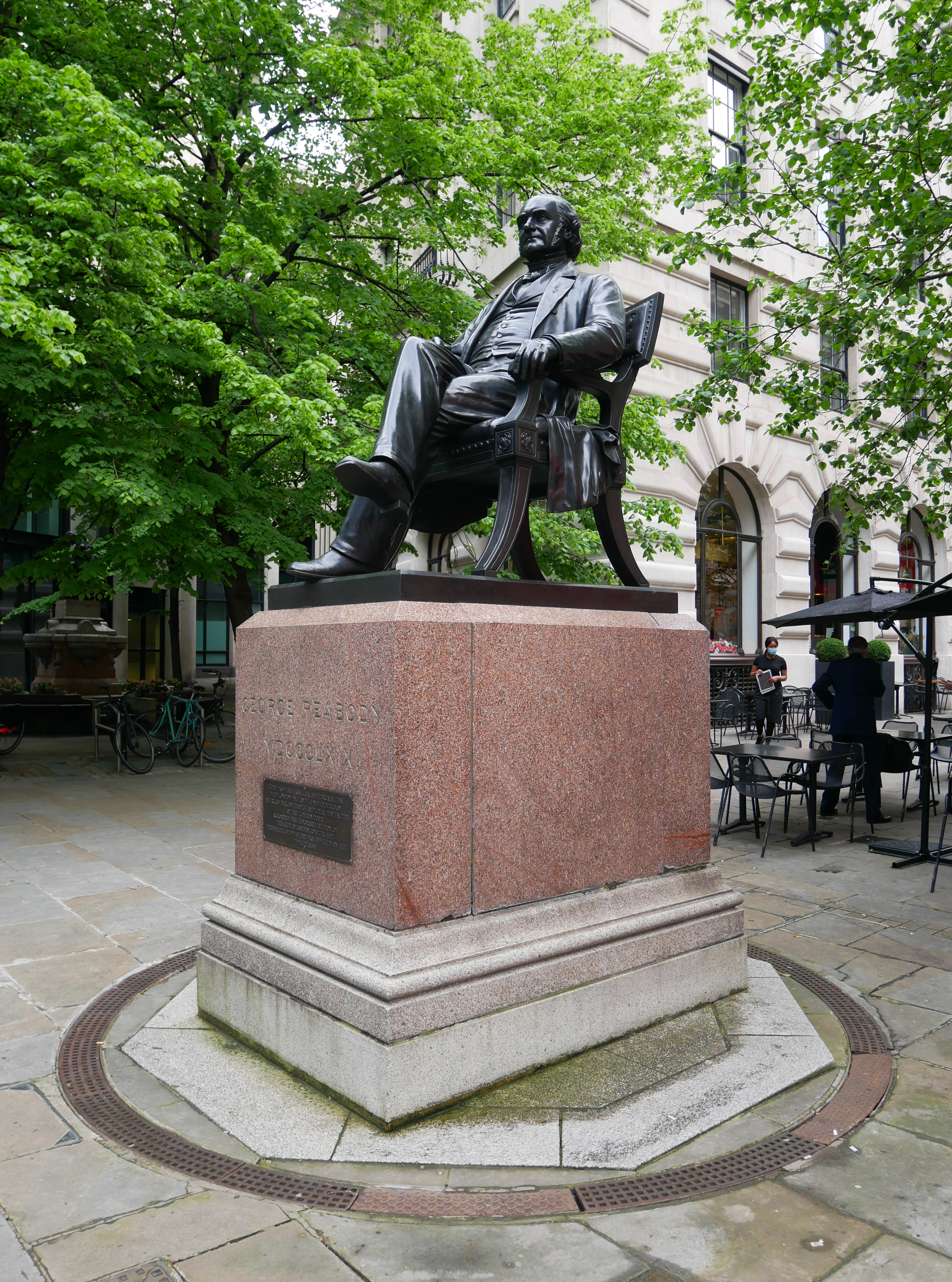
- The statue of George Peabody in 2021
- Artist: William Wetmore Story
- Year: 1869; 157 years ago
- Medium: Bronze
- Subject: George Peabody
- Dimensions: 216 cm × 163 cm (85 in × 64 in)
- Location: City of London, EC3V United Kingdom; 51°30′50″N 0°05′12″W

Listed Building – Grade II
- Official name: Statue of George Peabody
- Designated: 5 June 1972
- Reference no.: 1194436

The statue of George Peabody is a bronze statue of American businessman and philanthropist George Peabody. It is located behind the Royal Exchange in the City of London. The idea to honour Peabody was due to his large charitable contributions to housing in London. He established the Peabody Donation Fund (now known as the Peabody Trust), one of the largest housing associations in the country, to offer affordable housing for working-class citizens. During his lifetime, Peabody donated the equivalent of £85,000,000 to charitable institutions. For this reason he has been called the father of modern philanthropy.

The statue of Peabody is one of several public artworks on and near the Royal Exchange. It was sculpted by American artist William Wetmore Story and unveiled in 1869. The ceremony included speeches by Prince Edward and US Ambassador John Lothrop Motley. It was listed in 1972. A replica of the statue was installed in Baltimore, U.S., in 1890.

== Description ==
The bronze statue of George Peabody depicts him seated in a Victorian chair with legs crossed, wearing a coat and bowtie. Appearing relaxed, his right hand is resting on his thigh, and the left hand is placed on the armrest. The statue measures 2.16 metres (7 ft 1 in) tall and 1.63 metres (5 ft 4 in) wide and sits on a pink and grey granite plinth with moulded base. It is located behind the Royal Exchange, off Threadneedle Street in the City of London. The plinth rests on an octangular water drain where the Charity Drinking Fountain (also known as La Maternité) once stood.

Inscriptions on the plinth and statue read:

(front of plinth)
GEORGE PEABODY
MDCCCLXIX

(bronze plaque on plinth)
BORN DANVERS, MASS, U.S.A., 18TH FEBRUARY, 1795.
DIED LONDON ENGLAND 4TH NOVEMBER, 1869.
AMERICAN PHILANTHROPIST AND GREAT BENEFACTOR
OF THE LONDON POOR.
ACCORDED THE HONORARY FREEDOM OF
THE CITY OF LONDON, 10TH JULY, 1862.
THIS STATUE BY W.W. STORY WAS UNVEILED ON THE
23RD JULY, 1869.

(base of statue, right side)
FERD. V. MILLER fudit
MUNCHEN 1869.

(base of statue, left side)
W.W. STORY inv. et sculp
ROM 1868

The Peabody statue is one of many public artworks either on or near the Royal Exchange. Others include statues of Thomas Gresham, Richard Whittington and Hugh Myddelton, the pediment sculpture, the London Troops War Memorial, the equestrian statue of the Duke of Wellington, the Baron Paul Julius von Reuter Monument, the Jubilee Drinking Fountain and the Charity Drinking Fountain.

== Background ==
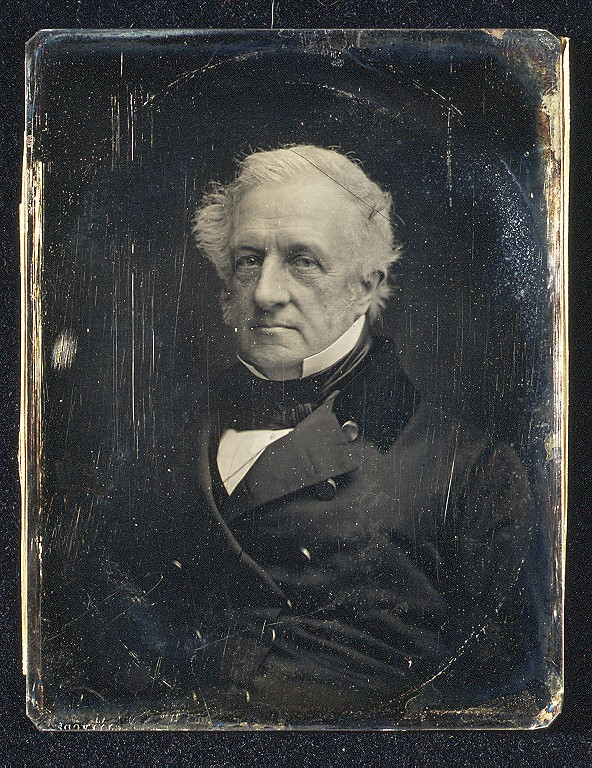
George Peabody in 1850

George Peabody was an American financier and philanthropist who moved to London in 1837 after opening an investment banking office during one of his many visits. Working with Junius Spencer Morgan, the two men founded the Peabody, Morgan & Co which later became Morgan, Grenfell & Co. Peabody never married and preferred to not live extravagantly. He never purchased a home and oftentimes did not employ any servants. Although a reserved person, Peabody enjoyed entertaining friends and taking them to social events. As his wealth grew, Peabody sought to use this for the public good. He asked Lord Shaftesbury for advice on where his philanthropy could be of use in London. Peabody was told there was a need for housing. His response was "to increase the efficiency of the less well-paid classes of workers by providing them with decent homes at a reasonable rent."

During the 1860s Peabody established the Peabody Donation Fund (now known as the Peabody Trust) where he donated over £500,000, something Queen Victoria called "an act wholly without parallel". This was one of many donations Peabody made during his lifetime. It is estimated he gave away the equivalent of £85,000,000 to various charitable institutions and is considered the father of modern philanthropy. The Peabody Trust is one of the country's largest housing associations with over 100,000 homes in London and the home counties. Due to his charitable donations, Peabody received the Freedom of the City of London and plans were made to erect a statue in his honour.

== History ==
=== Planning ===
On 24 May 1866 at the Guildhall a committee was organised to erect a statue of Peabody, noting his contributions to housing and that he was "a pattern of benevolence". Architect Robert William Billings opposed erecting the statue, arguing the funds necessary for it should be donated to Peabody's charities instead. It was nonetheless approved and plans were made to raise the necessary funds. Many people who had been assisted with his housing programmes made donations and it was noted "there were as many contributions in shillings as in pounds, for a large number of poor men and women welcomed this opportunity to express their gratitude to Peabody." An American writer noted that it was "paid for by common people, none of whom gave more than twenty-five dollars", although in May 1867 the City of London Corporation voted to contribute £500 towards erecting the statue. The site chosen for the statue, the former St Benet Fink churchyard behind the Royal Exchange, was decided in April 1867.

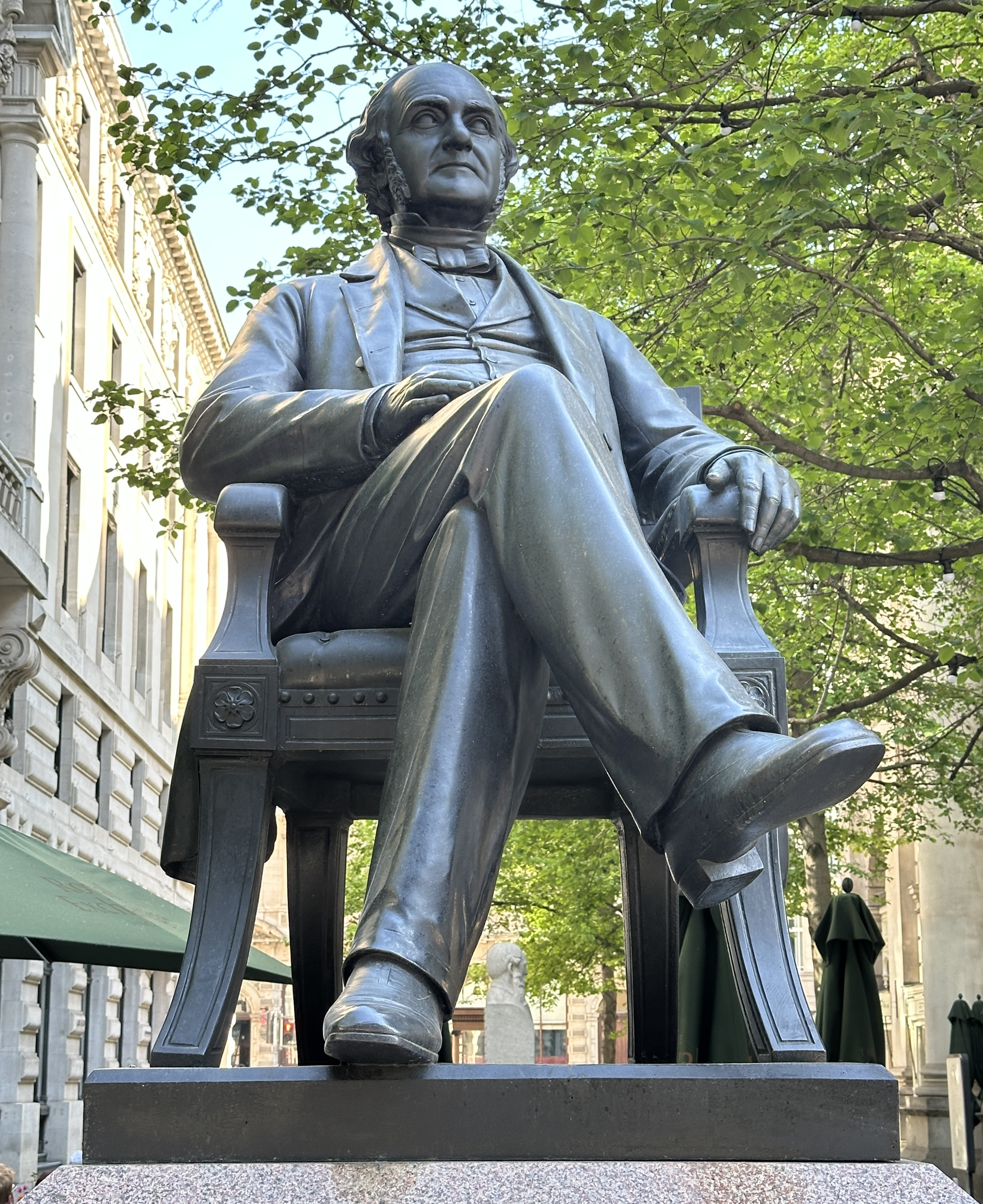
Closeup of the statue

Merchant Russell Sturgis was responsible for recommending the sculptor, William Wetmore Story, and a £2,500 contract was signed on 1 November 1867 which said Story would have the statue ready within two years. The other sculptors that had been considered were John Henry Foley, Thomas Woolner, and William Theed.

Peabody met with Story at the home of Curtis Lampson to pose for sketches. Peabody was already an admirer of Story's work and was pleased to find out he had been selected to create the sculpture. Story's other works in the UK include the Deverell Brothers statue in Lower Basildon and a bust of Richard Monckton Milnes, 1st Baron Houghton, at Trinity College, Cambridge. Peabody met with Story again in 1868 at the artist's studio in Rome. While working on the statue, it was viewed by US ambassador to the UK John Lothrop Motley who admired its strong resemblance to Peabody. The statue was founded by German artisan Ferdinand von Miller, whose other work in London is the United Kingdom Temperance and General Provident Institution Drinking Fountain in Clapham Common. Due to Peabody's failing health in early 1869, organisers were worried he would die before the statue was dedicated later that year. The pedestal was not ready, so a temporary stone pedestal was acquired. Due to time constraints, a letter was sent to Prince Edward, to unveil the statue instead of the queen.

=== Dedication ===
The unveiling ceremony took place on 23 July 1869, but by that time Peabody was too ill to attend. Before the dedication, a luncheon took place with notable attendees including philanthropist Angela Burdett-Coutts, 1st Baroness Burdett-Coutts. A procession travelled to the statue where the unveiling ceremony began in front of a large crowd. In addition to Prince Edward, speakers at the ceremony included Ambassador Motley, Story and former Lord Mayor of London and chairman of the memorial committee, Benjamin Samuel Phillips. Amongst his remarks, the prince said, "that England and America may go hand in hand in peace and prosperity."

The statue was then unveiled in front of an enthusiastic audience. Motley then spoke, quoting from an epitaph: "What I spent, that I had; what I saved, that I lost; what I gave away remains with me." Story entertained the crowd when his speech entailed pointing at the statue and saying, "That is my speech." A letter was read from Peabody thanking those responsible for the statue and noting "that an eminent American sculptor should have so well performed the task you gave him." Five months after the ceremony, Peabody died. A funeral took place at Westminster Abbey where a plaque later dedicated to him reads: "I have prayed my Heavenly Father day by day that I might be enabled before I died to show my gratitude for the blessings which he has bestowed upon me by doing some great good to my fellow men."

=== Later history ===
A replica of the statue, founded by Alessandro Nelli, was installed in Mount Vernon, Baltimore, U.S. in 1890. The statue in London was Grade II listed on 5 June 1972. In the 1980s it was moved to its present location where the Charity Drinking Fountain stood. The fountain was moved a short distance away on Royal Exchange Avenue. In 2024 protesters demonstrating against rent increases by the Peabody Trust gathered at the statue, holding placards, with one reading "George Peabody would be turning in his grave".

== See also ==
- List of public art in the City of London
