= Williamson Mausoleum at Orphans Cemetery =

Historic site in Dodge County, Georgia, US

- U.S. National Register of Historic Places
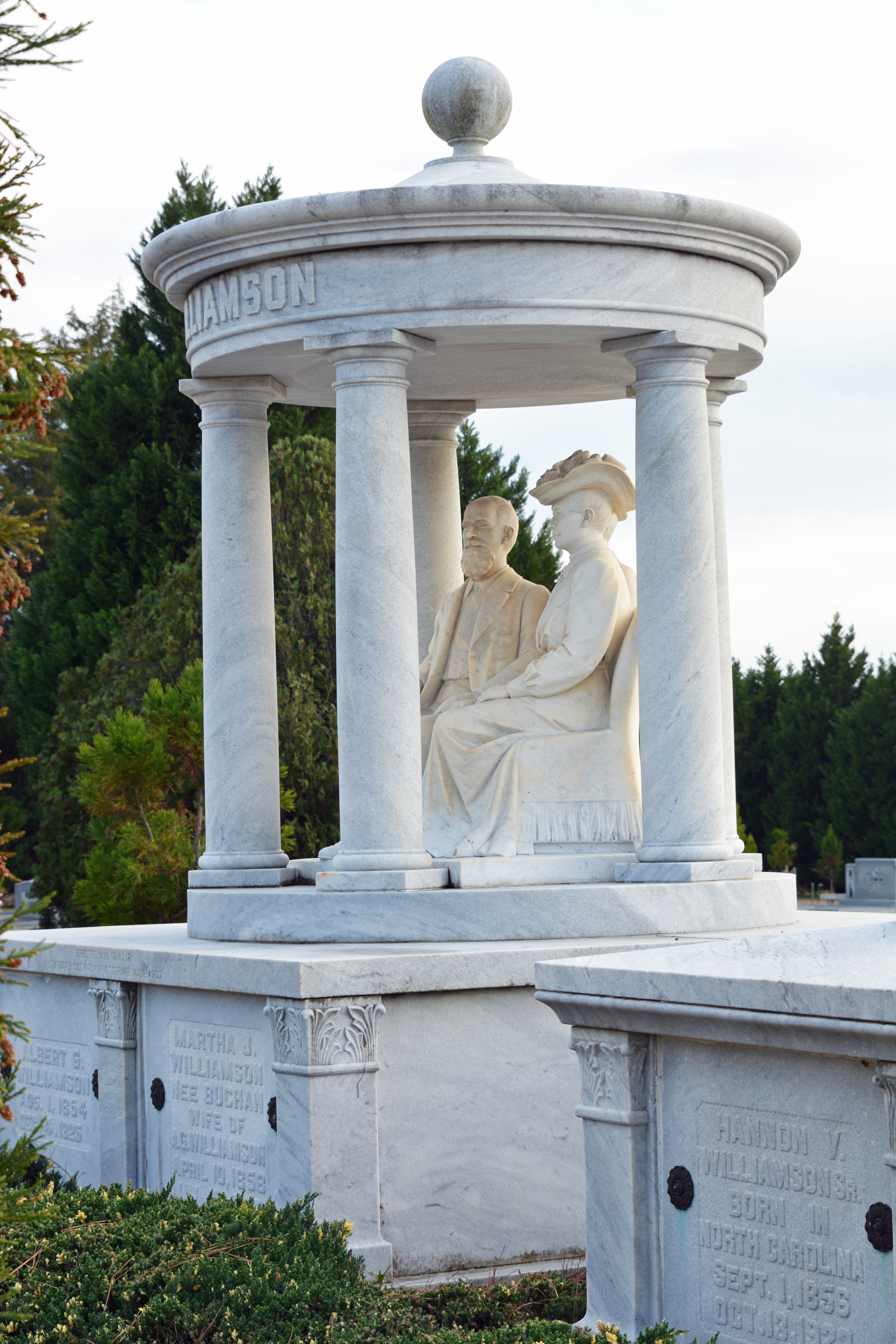

- Location within Georgia Location within the United States
- Nearest city: Eastman, Georgia
- Coordinates: 32.20668°N 83.21674°W
- Area: less than one acre
- Built: 1912
- Built by: Cordele Consolidated Marble Co., GA
- NRHP reference No.: 97001331
- Added to NRHP: November 7, 1997

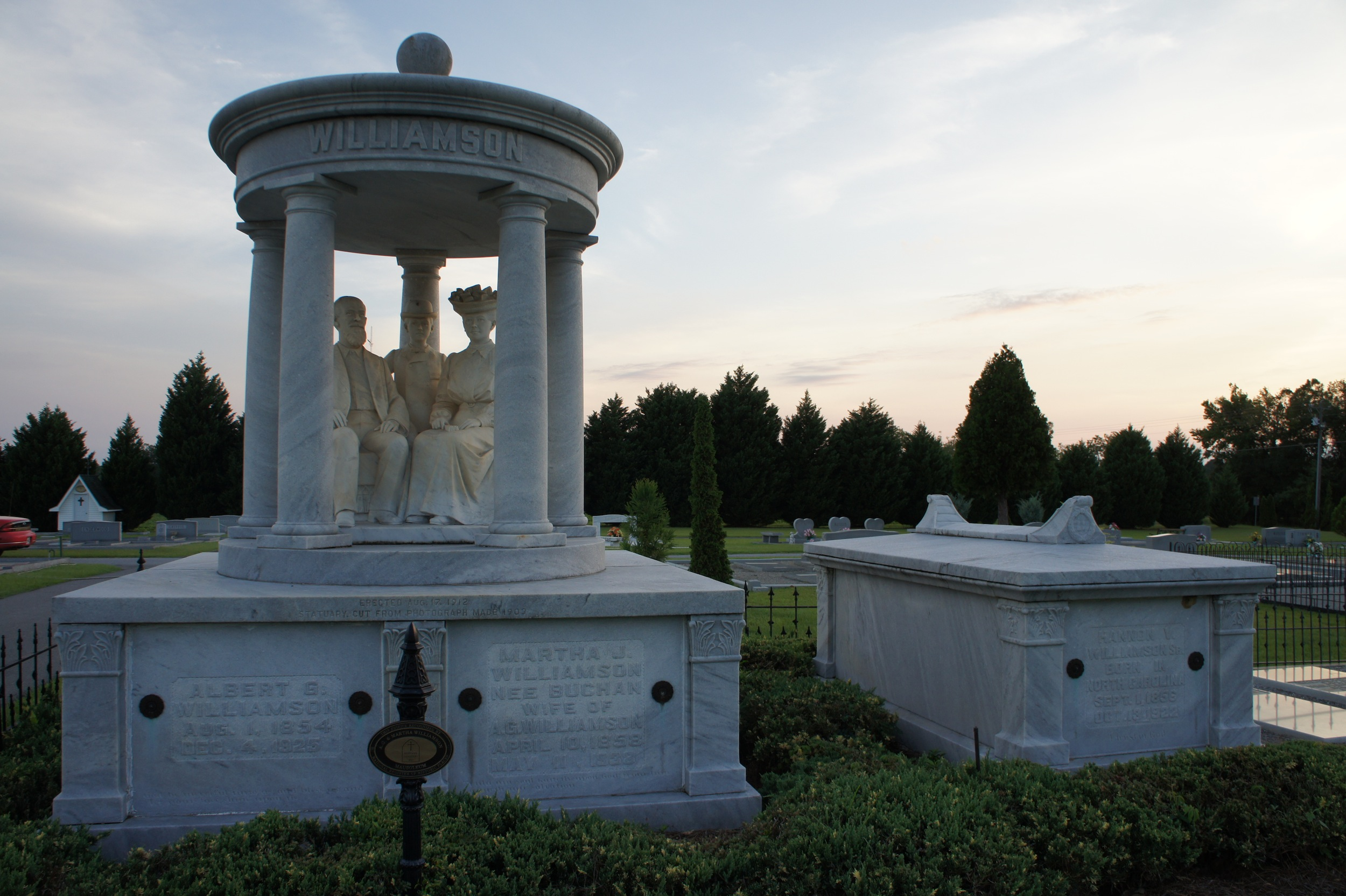

Orphans Cemetery is a four-acre cemetery located at the southwest corner of Orphans Cemetery Road and Jim Harp Road between US 341 and US 23 near Eastman, Georgia. The area was originally known as Orphans in honor of Albert Genavie Williamson, a Dodge County entrepreneur, and his five younger orphaned brothers who moved there in 1873–74 from North Carolina.

About 1885, A. G. Williamson donated the land and built the Orphans Christian Church. When a neighbor's child, George Paul Alexander Barnes, died in 1887, Williamson donated a burial plot across the road from the church. After the funeral, he had a magnolia tree planted by the child's grave. Other burials followed. The earliest were infants and young children of the Thomas, Weldy, and Lashley families. Other common names in the original acre are Hardy, Manley, Steele, Stuckey, and Williamson.

On August 17, 1912, Williamson had a twin mausoleum and columned canopy, built from Georgia marble, erected at the cemetery. Under the canopy above the mausoleum is life-size statuary depicting A. G., his wife, Martha J. Buchan Williamson, and their nephew, Jay Gould Williamson. The statuary was sculpted from Italian marble in Carrara, Italy, based on a family photograph.

A. G. and Martha Williamson are buried in the mausoleum and other members of the Williamson family, including three of the orphaned brothers, are buried around it in a lot surrounded by a wrought iron fence that was erected around 1912. The original magnolia tree, designated as Mr. Williamson's Magnolia, still stands in the cemetery near the mausoleum.

The Williamson Mausoleum at Orphans Cemetery was listed in the National Register of Historic Places on November 7, 1997.

== See also ==
- National Register of Historic Places listings in Dodge County, Georgia
