= Peabody High School (Milledgeville, Georgia) =

Coordinates: 33°4′54.2″N 83°13′53.9″W

- Milledgeville, Georgia

Information
- Established: c. 1891
- Closed: 1970s

Peabody School, also referred to as Peabody Model School, which was developed to become Peabody High School in 1927, was a public school and boarding school for girls in Milledgeville, Georgia. It was established in 1891 and phased out in the 1970s. It was on the campus of the Georgia Normal and Industrial College which became Georgia State College for Women and later Georgia College. Education program students from the college observed classes and seniors taught at the school for an hour per week. The Peabody Child & Family Center became an offshoot and operated until 2000.

A historical marker, garden, and scholarship fund at the college commemorate its existence.

== Alumni ==
=== Peabody High School ===
Alumni include Flannery O'Connor. & Lisa D. Cook, Economist and Member of the Federal Reserve Board of Governors
