= George Peabody House Museum =

Historic house in Massachusetts, United States

- George Peabody House
- U.S. National Register of Historic Places
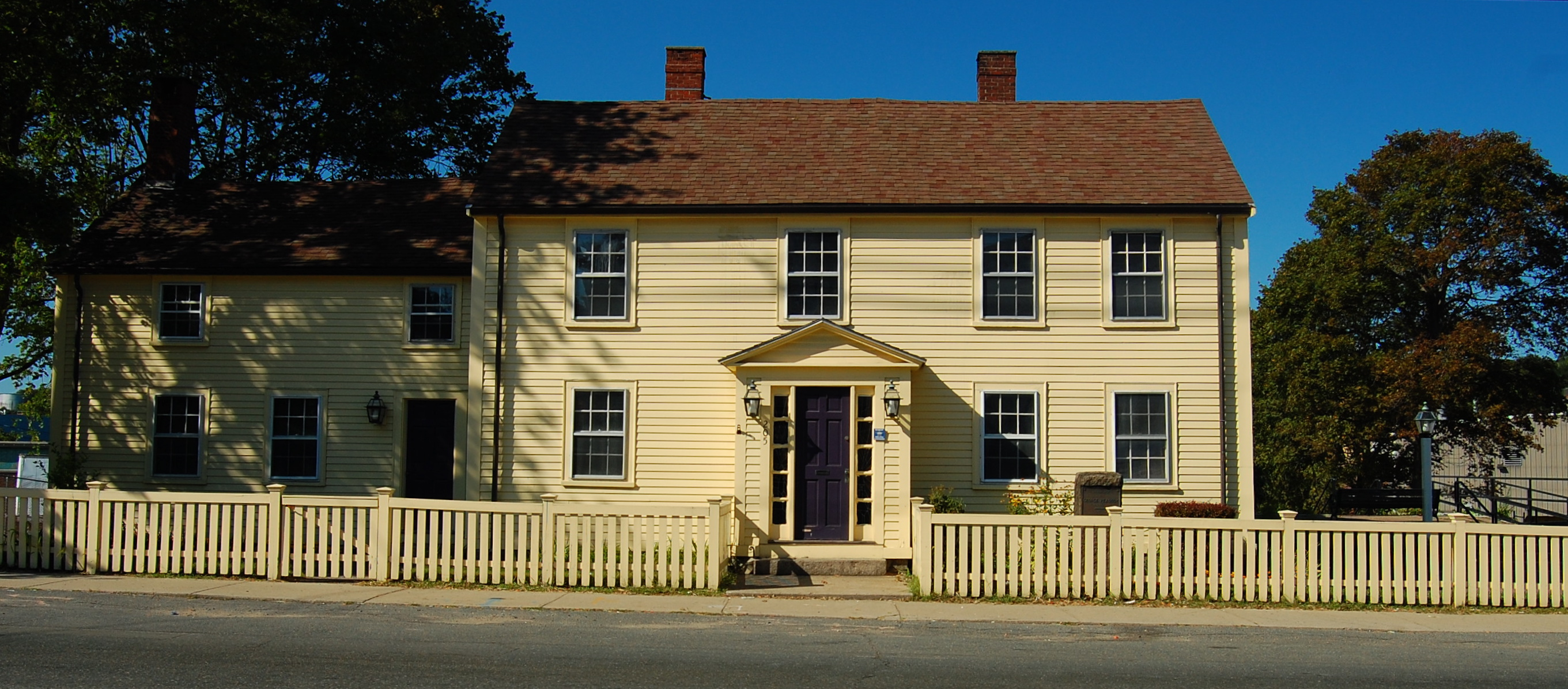
- George Peabody House at 205 Washington Street

- Location within Massachusetts Location within the United States
- Location: Peabody, Massachusetts
- Coordinates: 42°31′16″N 70°56′10″W
- Built: 1790
- Architectural style: Early Republic, Federal
- NRHP reference No.: 88000911
- Added to NRHP: July 6, 1988

The George Peabody House Museum is a historic house museum at 205 Washington Street in Peabody, Massachusetts. It is dedicated to the life and deeds of 19th century U.S. entrepreneur, philanthropist, and namesake of the city, George Peabody. The museum shares its location with the Peabody Leather Museum. Within its walls, in 1795, George Peabody was born in what was then called South Danvers.

== History ==
In 1769, John Southwick, Jr., was the owner of a parcel of land where the museum now sits. He gave the vacant 12-acre (49,000 m^{2}) lot to his daughter, Hannah, and her husband, Daniel Purinton, a cordwainer. Mortgage records from 1786 indicate there was a chocolate mill on the property, and, by 1794, records mention "other building" but not specifically "mills." In April 1795, Daniel Purinton sold the land and buildings to Thomas Peabody. It is possible that the Peabody family had been renting the property for over a year, and that George Peabody was born in the house during the rental period, although this cannot be confirmed.

On May 13, 1811, Thomas Peabody died, leaving his oldest son, David, as executor. There were three mortgages on the land and buildings at the time of Thomas's death. David took out two mortgages on the property in 1812: to Jesse Emerson in January, and to Mary Titcomb of Newburyport later in the year. On November 22, 1816, George Peabody bought the family homestead from his brother for $109. He paid off the Titcomb mortgage in the summer of 1817, which allowed his mother to remain living in the house. In 1832, two years after his mother's death, George Peabody sold the property to David Shove for $1,465. After the sale, George Peabody never owned another property in his life; he only rented.

Elijah Upton, a glue manufacturer with a factory complex at the corner of Washington Street and Allen's Lane, owned the land until 1883, when it was sold to Charles B. Farley. By this point the house had been divided into two separate apartments, which Farley rented out to a produce peddler, a carpenter, and a stable hand.

In 1919, the Peabody Historical Society erected a plaque and post honoring the house as the birthplace of George Peabody; the memorial still exists today. In the same year Charles Farley sold the house to the American Glue Company, which housed its workers there for many years. From the 1960s to the 1980s, Eastman Gelatin employees called it home.

In 1989, the city bought the house from Eastman and turned it into the George Peabody House Museum.

The property was listed on the National Register of Historic Places in 1988.

== See also ==
- National Register of Historic Places listings in Essex County, Massachusetts
