= Peabody Elementary School =

Peabody Elementary School may refer to

in the United States

- Peabody Elementary School (Colorado) in Centennial, Colorado
- Peabody Elementary School (Illinois) in Chicago, Illinois
- Peabody-Burns Elementary School, in Peabody, Kansas
- Peabody Elementary School (Memphis, Tennessee) in Memphis, Tennessee, listed on the NRHP in Tennessee
- Peabody Elementary School (Trenton, Tennessee) in Trenton, Tennessee
- George Peabody Elementary School in San Francisco, California

== See also ==
- Peabody High School (disambiguation)
- Peabody School (disambiguation)
