= Peabody School (Eastman, Georgia) =

- U.S. National Register of Historic Places
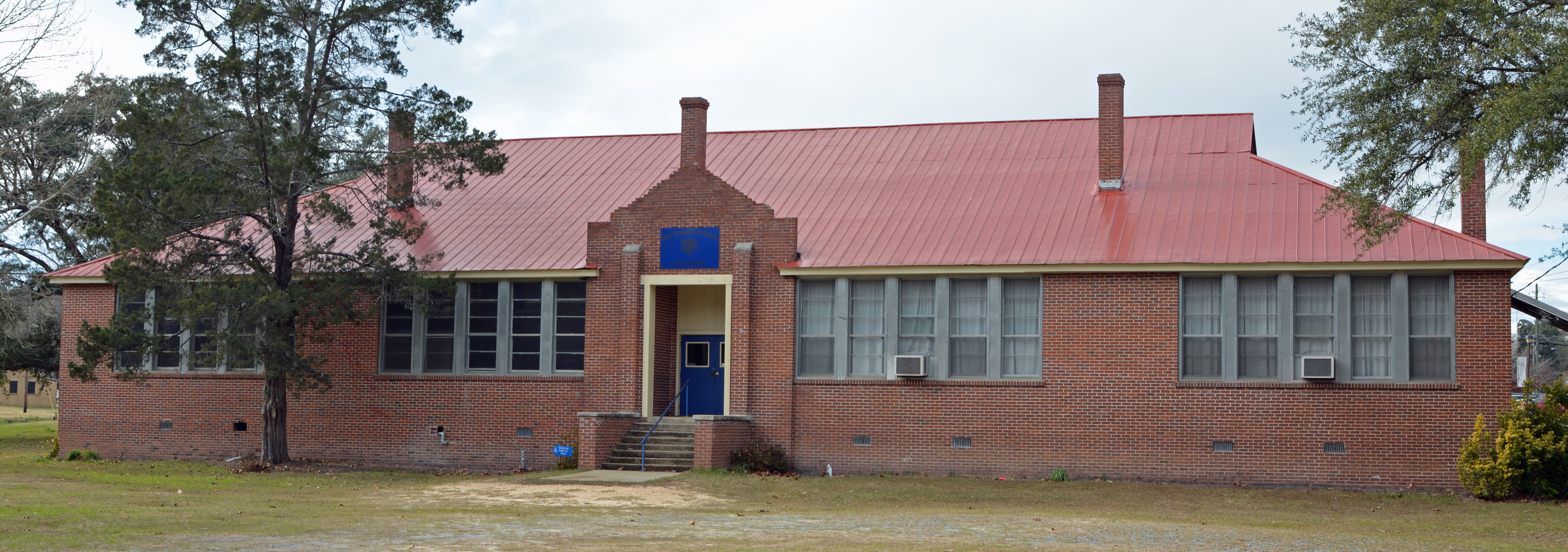
- Peabody School in 2016

- Location within Georgia Location within the United States
- Location: Eastman, Georgia
- Coordinates: 32.19104°N 83.17997°W
- Built: 1938; 88 years ago
- Architect: Edward Columbus Hosford; et al.
- Architectural style: Colonial Revival, International Style
- NRHP reference No.: 04001238
- Added to NRHP: November 20, 2004

Peabody School, also known as Peabody High School, is a former school for African Americans on Herman Avenue in Eastman, Georgia. Built in 1938, it was designed by Eastman-born American architect Edward Columbus Hosford, who is noted for the courthouses and other buildings that he designed in Florida, Georgia and Texas. The brick building's design includes elements of the Colonial Revival style. The segregated school educated the African-American high school students of Eastman and most other parts of Dodge County.

In 1950, the school became an elementary school serving grades 1 through 8 after a new high school opened. It was closed in 1970 and its students were integrated into Dodge County High School and other formerly all-white public schools in Dodge County.

On November 20, 2004, the building was added to the National Register of Historic Places. It was vacant at the time. The school, which is owned by the United Concerned Citizens of Dodge County, received a $16,000 grant for its rehabilitation in the same year.

The school competed in the Georgia Interscholastic Association and won girls Class A state basketball championships.

== See also ==
- National Register of Historic Places listings in Dodge County, Georgia
