= Royal Exchange, London =

Commercial building in London (built 1571, rebuilt 1844)

The Royal Exchange
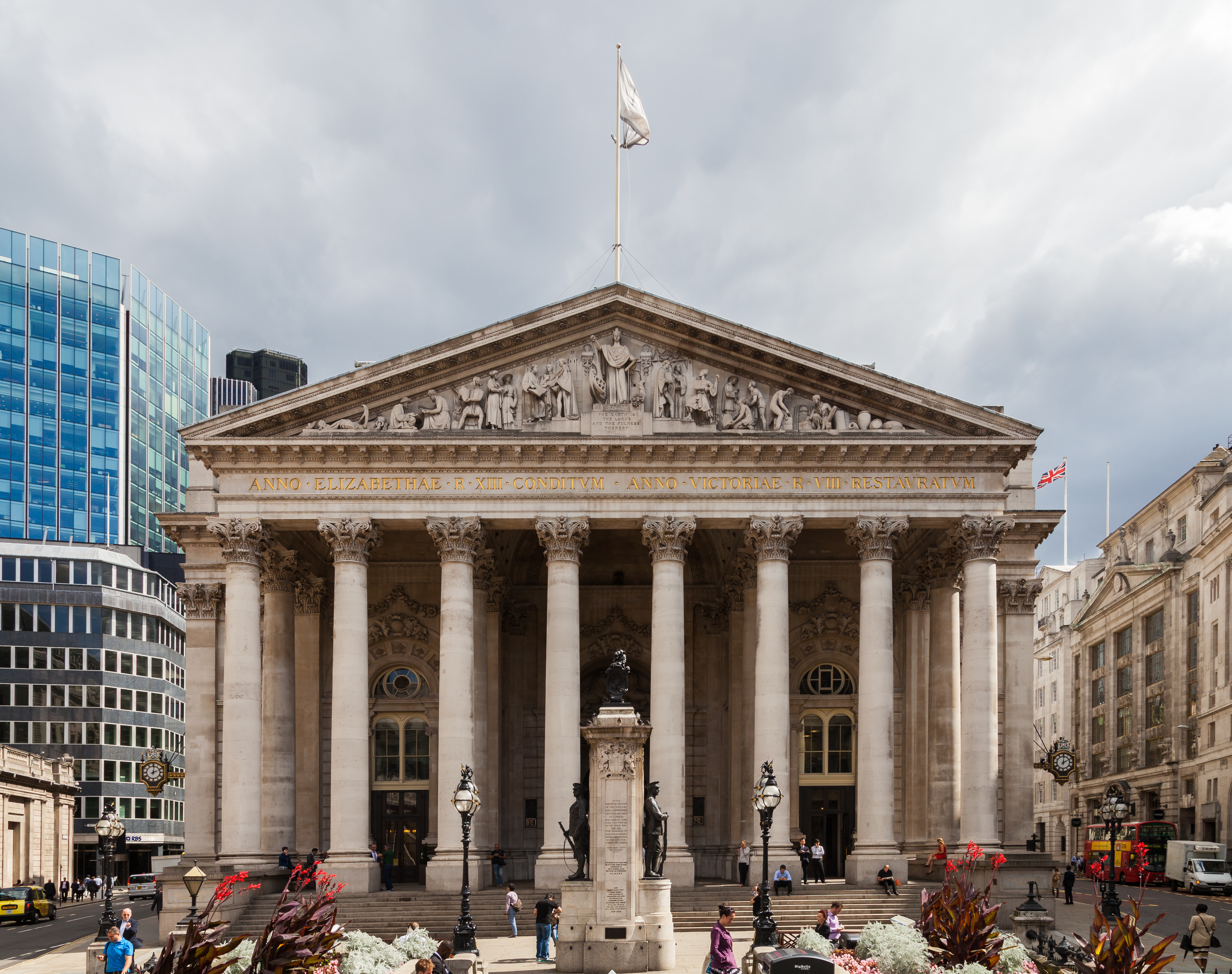
- The west façade of the Royal Exchange from the Bank junction
- Location: London, United Kingdom
- Coordinates: 51°30′49″N 0°05′14″W
- Opened: 23 January 1571; 455 years ago (original structure); 28 October 1844; 182 years ago (current structure)
- Owner: The Ardent Companies (since 2022)
- Architect: Sir William Tite
- Num. of stores: 33 stores; 5 restaurants and cafes
- Parking: None
- Public transit: Bank-Monument
- Website: theroyalexchange.co.uk

The Royal Exchange is a building in central London, built to house the London Stock Exchange, which now operates elsewhere. Today, the Royal Exchange contains restaurants and luxury shops.

It was founded in the 16th century by the merchant Sir Thomas Gresham on the suggestion of his factor Richard Clough to act as a centre of commerce for the City of London. The site was provided by the City of London Corporation and the Worshipful Company of Mercers, who still jointly own the freehold. The original foundation was ceremonially opened by Queen Elizabeth I who granted it its "royal" title. Rebuilt in the 1840s, the current neoclassical building has a trapezoidal floor plan and is flanked by Cornhill and Threadneedle Street, which converge at Bank junction in the heart of the city. It lies in the Ward of Cornhill.

The exchange building has twice been destroyed by fire and subsequently rebuilt. The present building was designed by Sir William Tite. The site also housed the Lloyd's insurance market for nearly 150 years.

Traditionally, the steps of the Royal Exchange are the place where certain royal proclamations (such as the dissolution of parliament) are read out by either a herald or a crier. Following the death or abdication of a monarch and the confirmation of the next monarch's accession to the throne by the Accession Council, the Royal Exchange Building is one of the locations where a herald proclaims the new monarch's reign to the public.

== History ==
Richard Clough initially suggested building the exchange in 1562, and its original design was inspired by the Stock Exchange in Antwerp, the world's first purpose-built bourse, with which Thomas Gresham, the representative of the English crown in Antwerp, was familiar, and on which the designs of the bourses of Amsterdam (1611) and Rotterdam would also be based.

It was Britain's first specialist commercial building, and Clough oversaw the importing of some of the materials from Antwerp: stone, slate, wainscot and glass, for which he paid thousands of pounds himself. The Royal Exchange was officially opened on 23 January 1571 by Queen Elizabeth I, who awarded the building its royal title and a licence to sell alcohol and valuable goods. Only the exchange of goods took place until the 17th century. Stockbrokers were not allowed into the Royal Exchange because of their rude manners, hence they had to operate from other establishments in the vicinity, such as Jonathan's Coffee-House. Gresham's original building was destroyed in the Great Fire of London in 1666.

Take a view of the Royal Exchange in London, a place more venerable than many courts of justice, where the representatives of all nations meet for the benefit of mankind. There the Jew, the Mahometan [Muslim], and the Christian transact together, as though they all professed the same religion, and give the name of infidel to none but bankrupts. There the Presbyterian confides in the Anabaptist, and the Churchman depends on the Quaker's word.

— Voltaire's observation of the Royal Exchange in Letters on the English (1733).

A second complex was built on the site, designed by Edward Jarman and opened in 1669. It featured a tall wooden tower over the south entrance in Corn Hill; this eventually fell into disrepair and, in 1821, was replaced by a new stone tower and cupola designed by George Smith. The second Exchange was also burned down on 10 January 1838 in a fire caused by an overheated stove; the blaze was visible from Windsor, 24 miles (39 km) away. It had been used by the Lloyd's insurance market, which was forced to move temporarily to South Sea House following the 1838 fire.

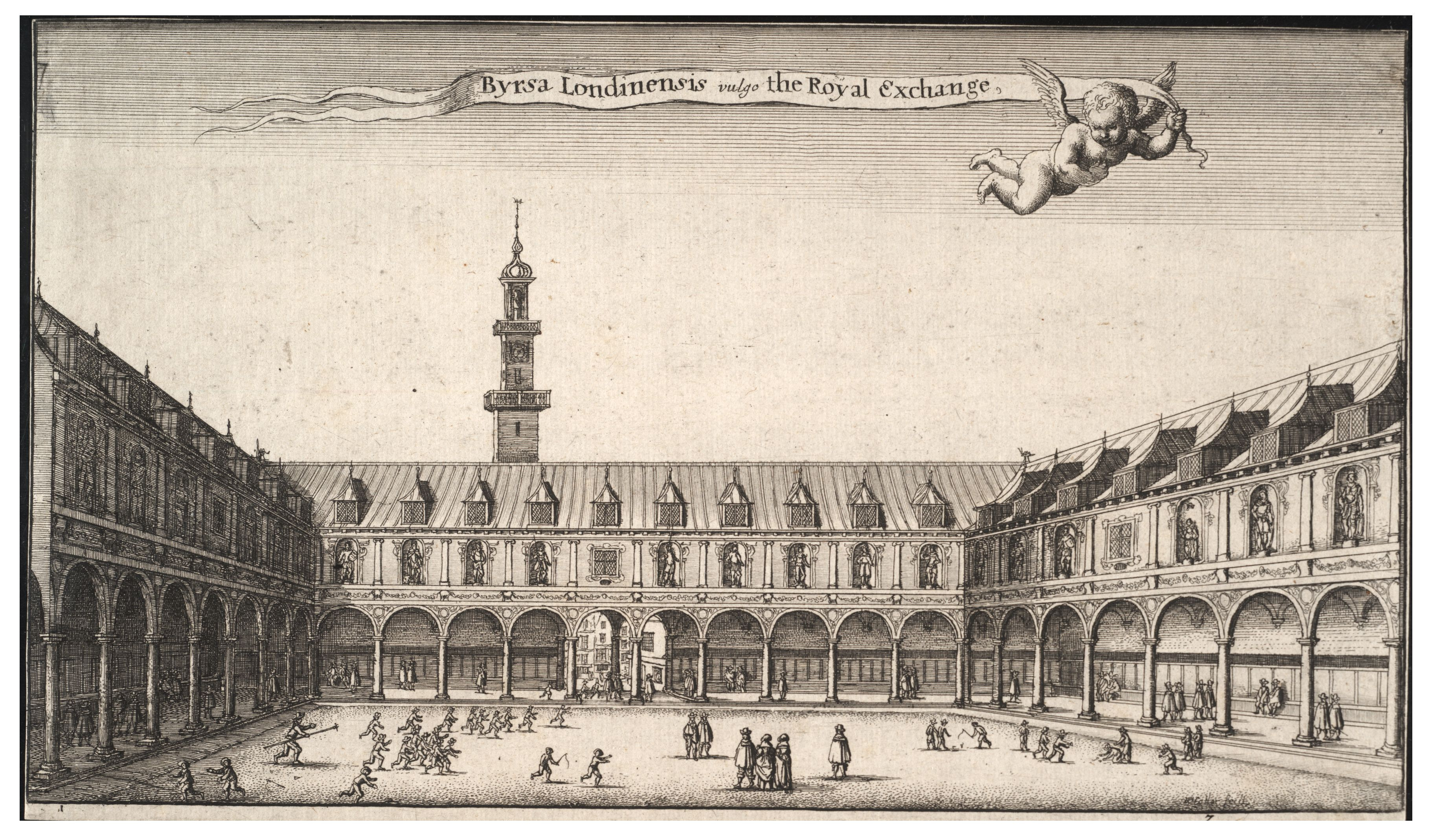
The original Royal Exchange in an engraving by Wenceslaus Hollar

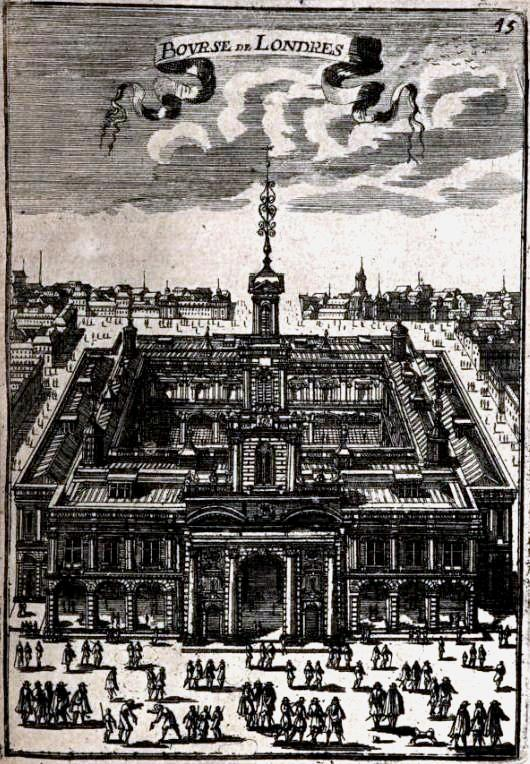
The second Royal Exchange by Alain Manesson Mallet in 1683

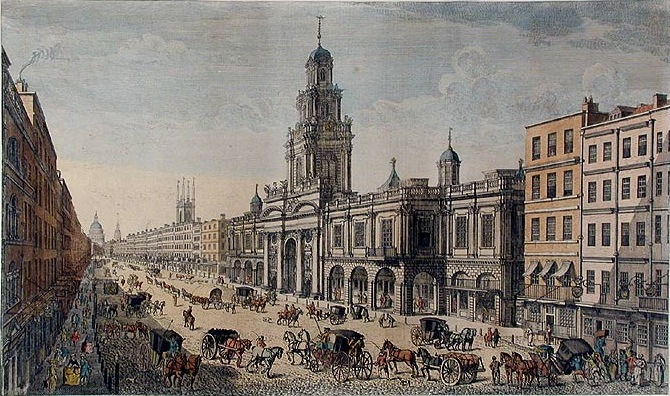
The Royal Exchange from Corn Hill by Thomas Bowles in 1781

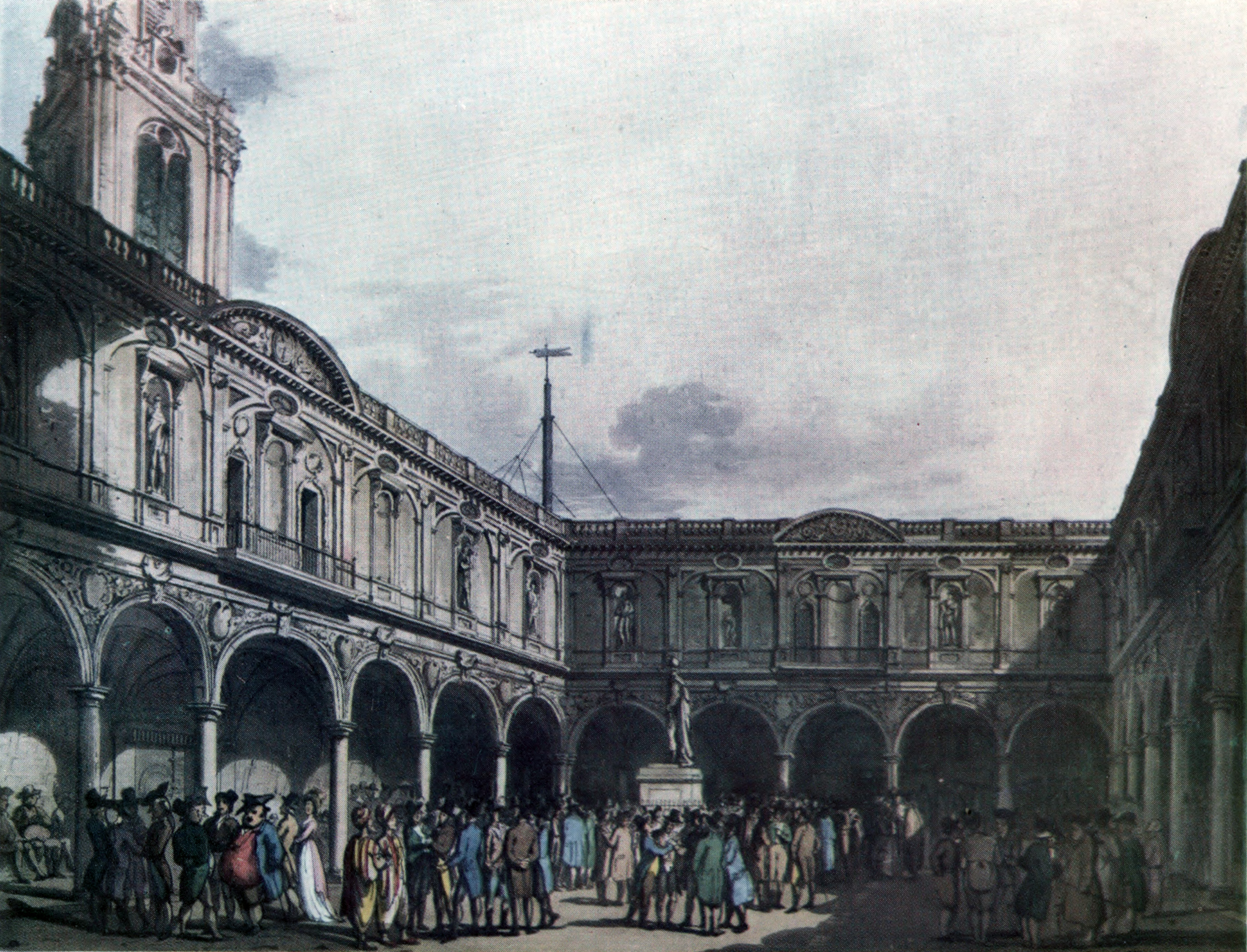
The interior of the Exchange in the late 18th century

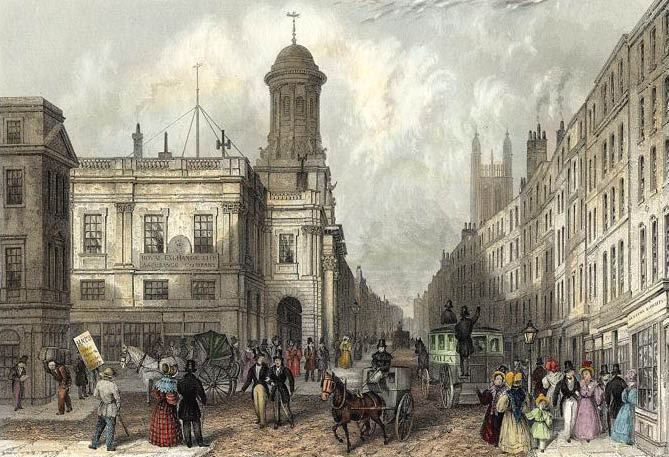
The Royal Exchange in 1837 shortly before it was destroyed by fire, showing the replacement tower

=== Current building ===
The third Royal Exchange building, which still stands today, was designed by Sir William Tite who won the commission through a competition in 1839-40 at the expense of C. R. Cockerell. Tite's design adheres to the original layout–consisting of a four-sided structure surrounding a central courtyard where merchants and tradesmen could do business. The internal works, designed by Edward I'Anson, made use of concrete—an early example of this modern construction method. It features pedimental sculpture by Richard Westmacott (the younger), and ornamental cast ironwork by Henry Grissell's Regent's Canal Ironworks. It was opened by Queen Victoria on 28 October 1844, though trading did not commence until 1 January 1845.

Paul Julius Reuter established the Reuters news agency at No. 1, Royal Exchange Buildings (opposite and to the east of the Royal Exchange) in 1851. It later moved to Fleet Street.

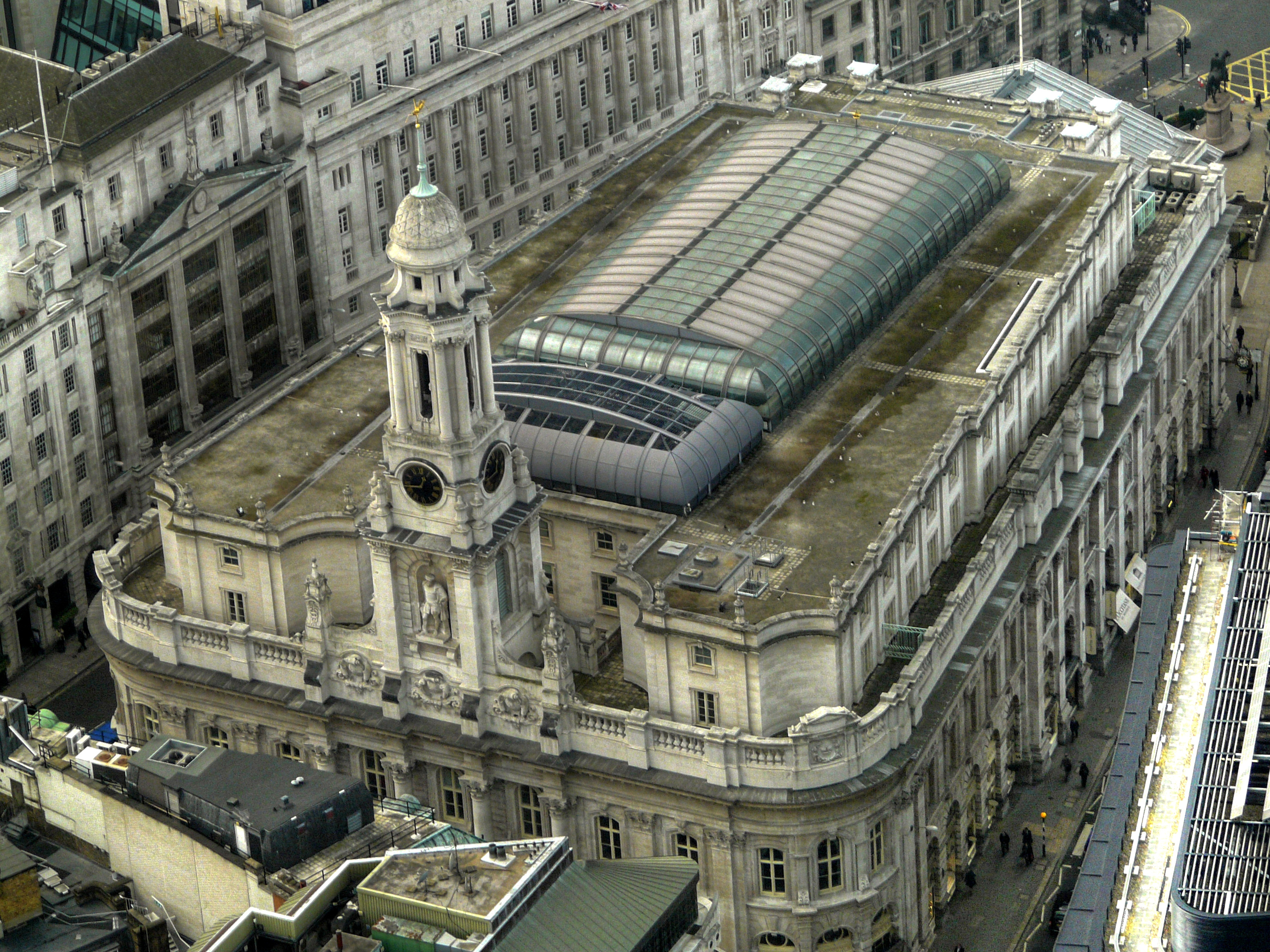
Aerial view from the rear

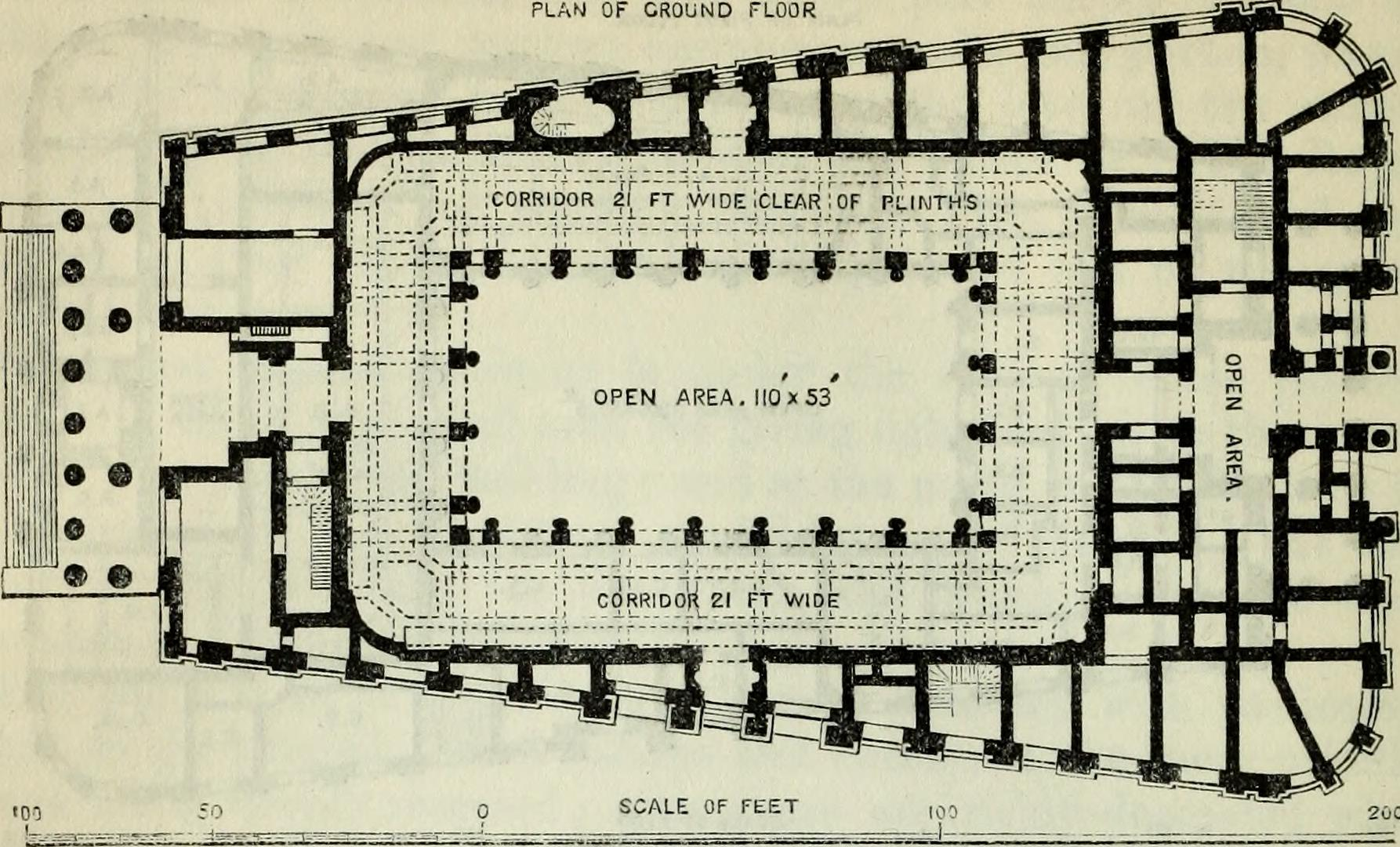
Plan of the ground floor

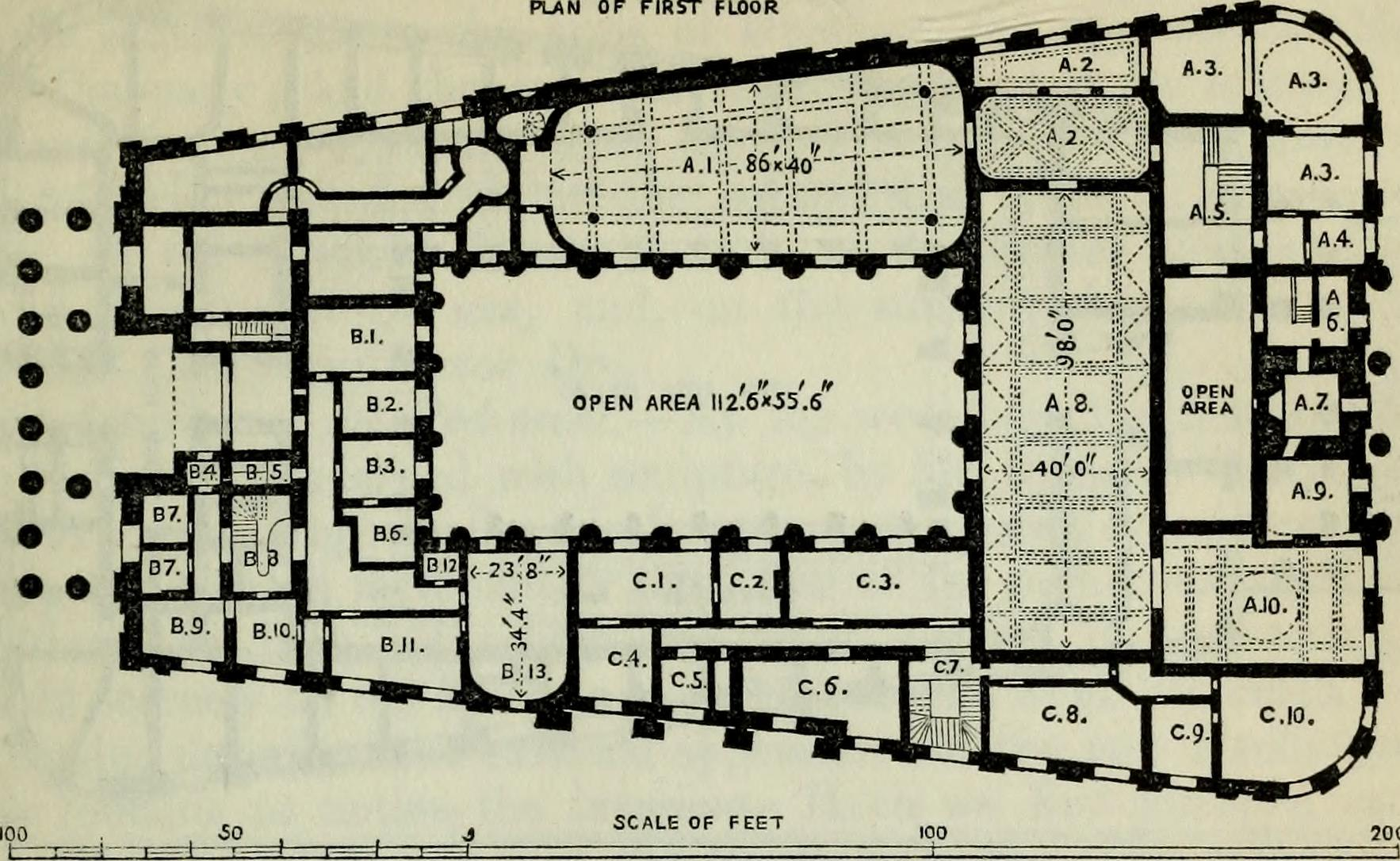
Plan of the first floor

=== Portico and pediment ===
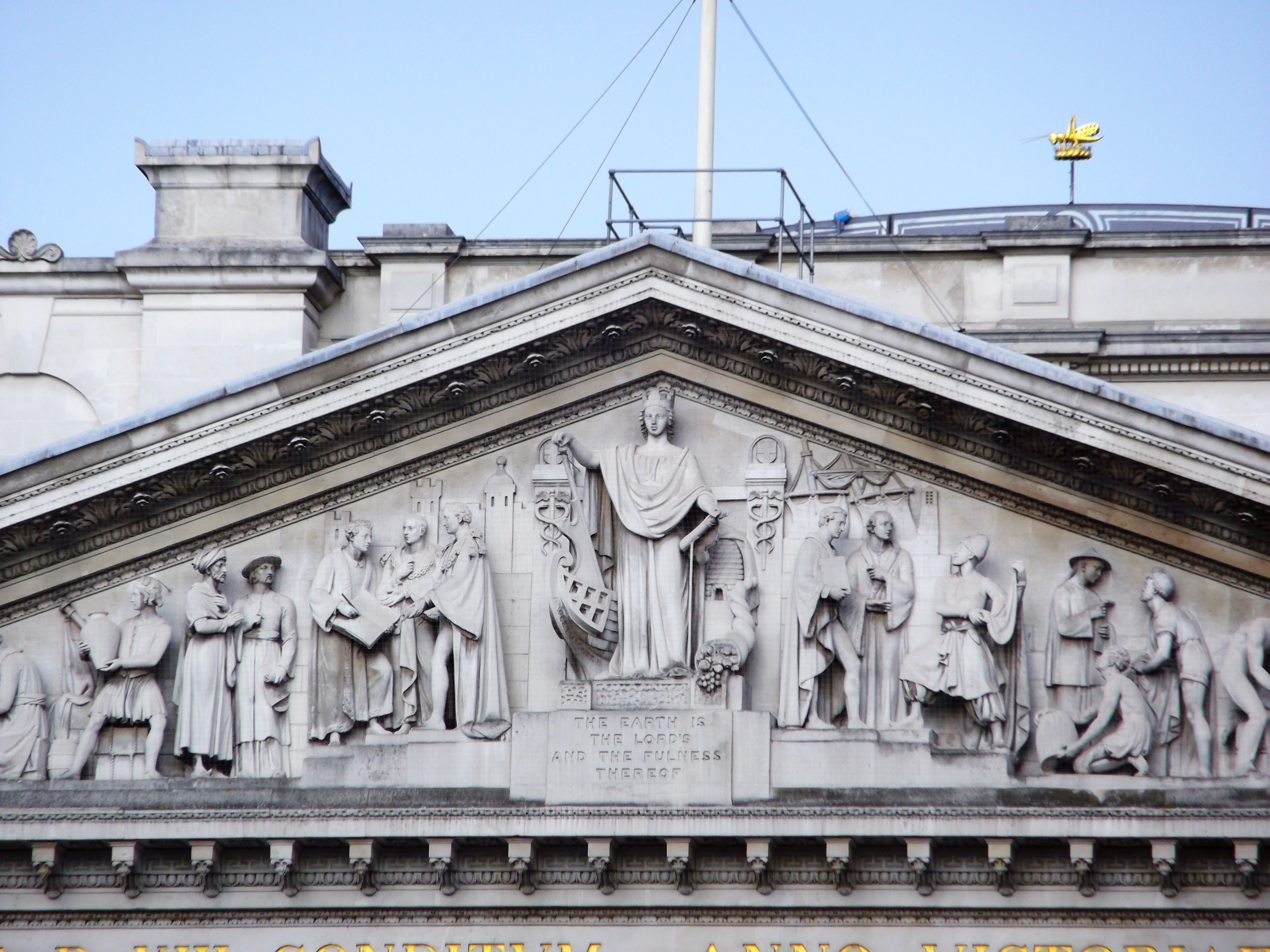
Detail of the pedimental sculpture

The western end of the building consists of a portico of eight Corinthian columns topped by a pediment containing a tympanum with relief sculpture by Richard Westmacott (the younger) of seventeen figures representing London merchants and foreign traders. The central allegorical figure represents Commerce, above an inscription chosen by Albert, Prince Consort from Psalm 24: "The Earth is the Lord's, and the fulness thereof". The Latin inscription on the frieze states:

Anno XIII. Elizabethae R. Conditvm; Anno VIII. Victoriae R. Restavratvm.

or "founded in the thirteenth year of Queen Elizabeth, and restored in the eighth of Queen Victoria".

=== Statues ===
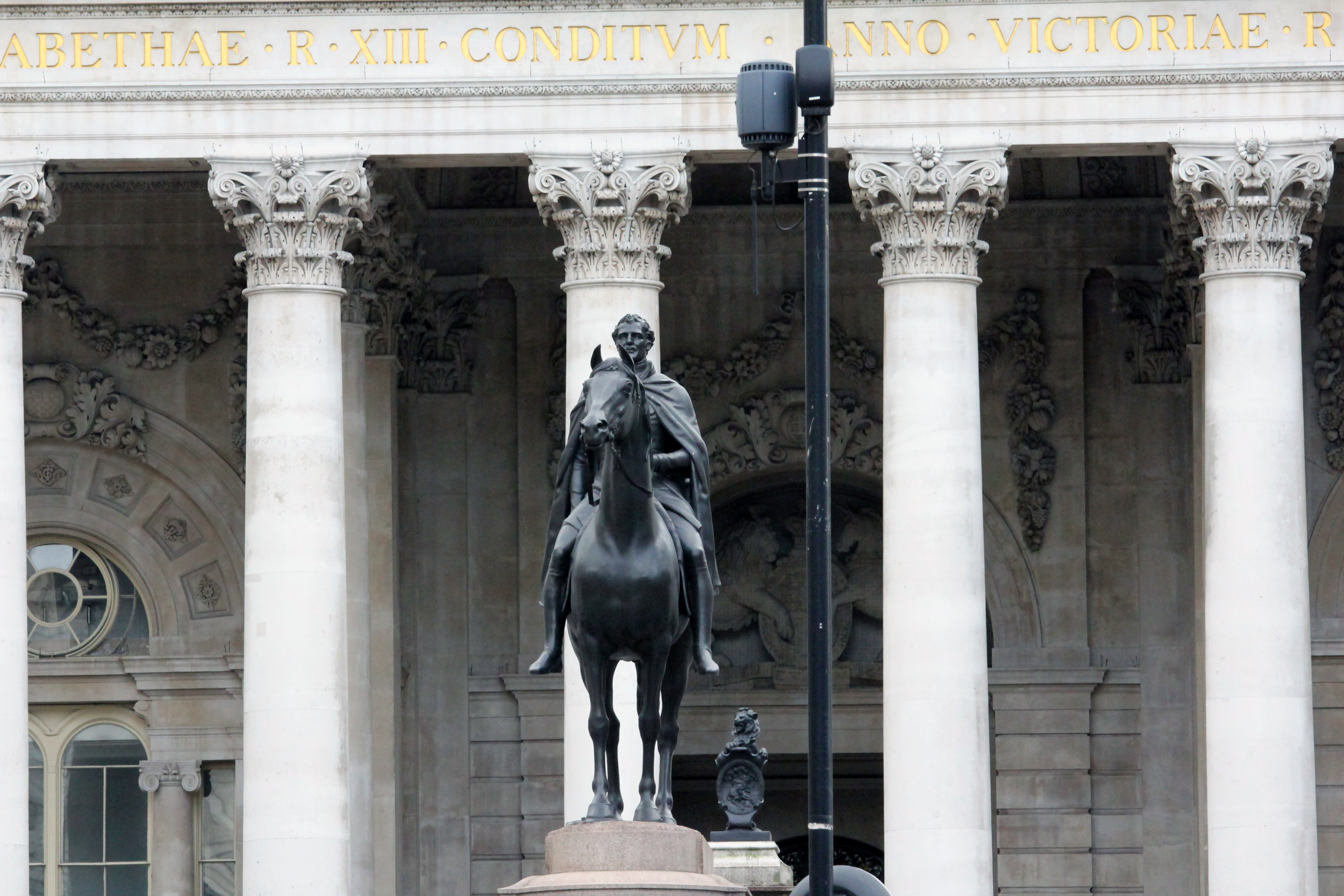
Chantrey's equestrian statue of Wellington, with the lion of the London Troops Memorial behind.

Two statues stand in niches in the central courtyard. Charles II (a copy of 1792 by John Spiller after Grinling Gibbons' statue in the centre of the 17th century courtyard) and Queen Elizabeth I by Musgrave Watson, 1844. The Charles II statue survived the fire of 1838 that destroyed the previous Exchange. The Elizabeth I statue was commissioned as she was the monarch who had conferred the status "Royal" on the Exchange.

In front of the portico of the Royal Exchange is a statue of Arthur Wellesley, 1st Duke of Wellington, the last work of Sir Francis Leggatt Chantrey. The bronze used to cast it was donated by the government and sourced from French cannons captured during the Napoleonic Wars. It was unveiled on 18 June 1844, the anniversary of the Battle of Waterloo, in the presence of the King of Saxony.

Between the Wellington statue and the exchange steps is the London Troops Memorial commemorating the dead of military units associated with the City and County of London during the First World War. Designed by Sir Aston Webb, the monument is flanked by two bronze statues of soldiers and surmounted by a lion, all sculpted by Alfred Drury. It was unveiled on 12 November 1920 in the presence of the Duke of York, later King George VI.

=== The Gresham Grasshopper ===
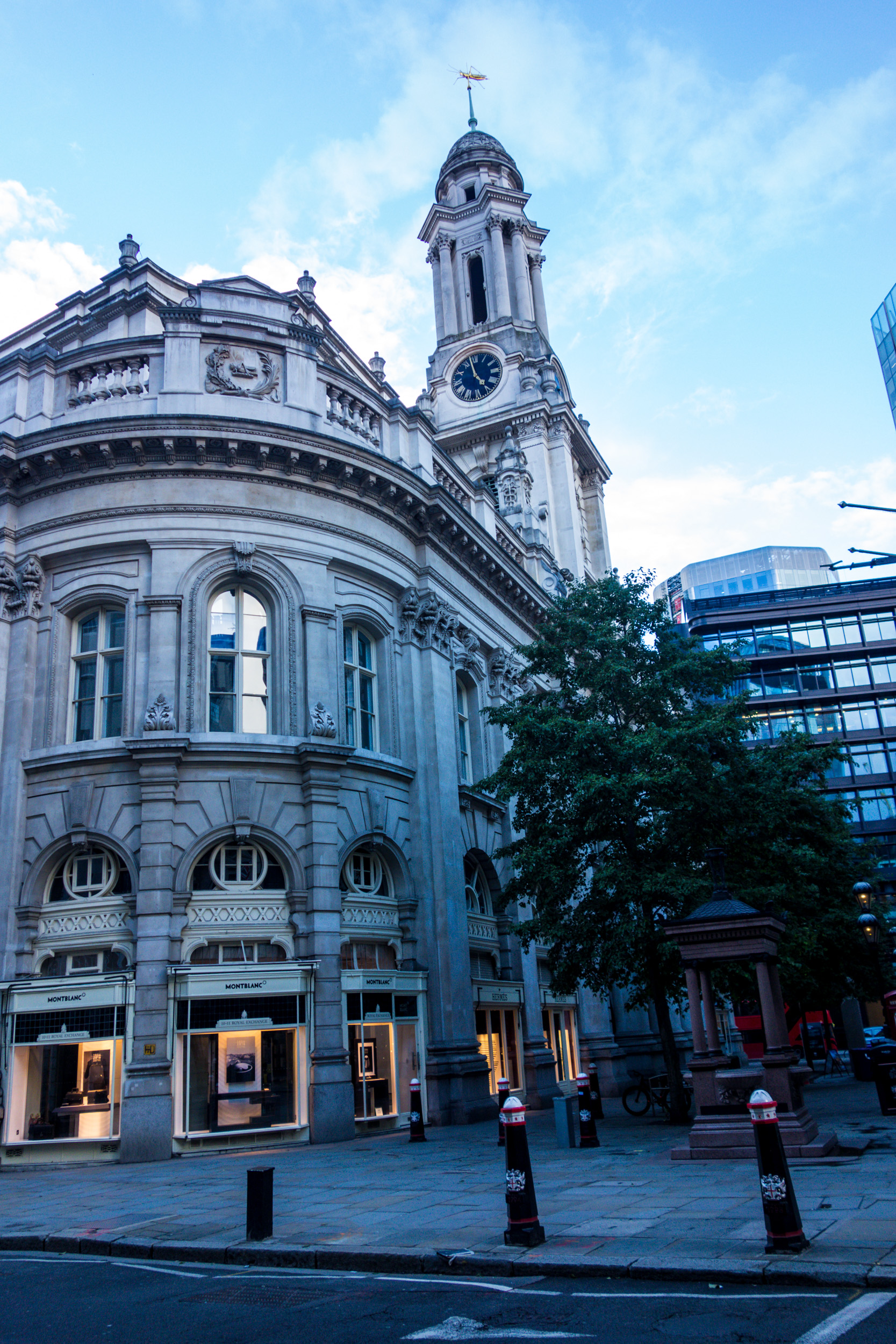
The northeast corner of the Royal Exchange, showing the Gresham Grasshopper on top of the clock tower.

The golden Gresham Grasshopper is the Royal Exchange's weathervane and was the crest of the founder, Sir Thomas Gresham. According to legend, a grasshopper's chirps once led to the discovery of a foundling, who became the first of the house of Gresham and the ancestor of Sir Thomas Gresham. The Grasshopper weathervane was rescued from the 1838 fire and is 11 feet (3.4 m) long. It stands 177 feet (54 m) above street level on a clock tower which has a clock by Edward John Dent. A similar grasshopper weathervane on the Faneuil Hall in Boston, Massachusetts was made by Shem Drowne in 1742 and was inspired by the London example.

=== Bells ===
The tower contains a chime of 15 bells all cast by Charles and George Mears of Whitechapel in 1844, with a mechanism that can play God Save the King, The Roast Beef of Old England, Rule Britannia! and Psalm 104. The combined weight of them is 131 long cwt 1 qr (14,700 lb or 6,670 kg). The original plan was to have the same number of bells as before the fire (nine) but was increased to 15 at the suggestion of Edward John Dent, who, having visited Brussels to obtain information as to the arrangement of carillons, was convinced to recommend that the number so that a greater range of tunes could be played. Professor Taylor advised the committee to increase them to fifteen, which would then allow of playing in three octaves. The largest is also the hour bell, and bears the following inscription "Cast for the Royal Exchange in the year of grace 1844; Richard Lambert Jones, Chairman of the Gresham College Committee; Daniel Watney, Master of the Mercers' Company; Ebenezer Trottman, Assistant; William Tite, Architect; Charles and George Mears, founders." The others only bear the words "Royal Exchange, 1844."

=== Murals ===
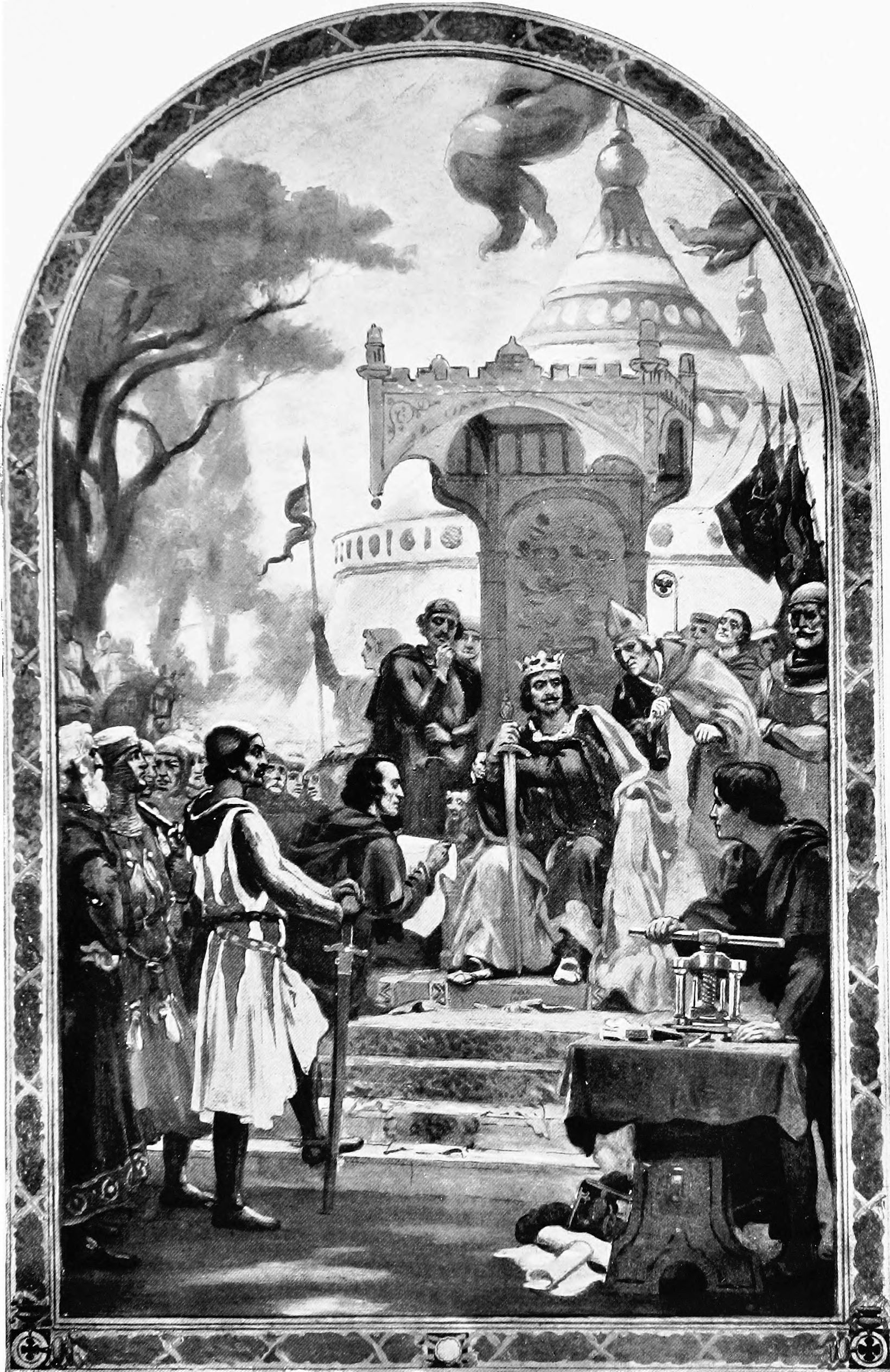
Mural depicting King John Sealing Magna Carta by Ernest Normand.

From 1892, twenty-four scenes from London's history were painted on the first-floor walls by artists including Sir Frederic Leighton, Sir Frank Brangwyn and Stanhope Forbes. The murals run as a sequence:

- Phoenicians trading with the early Britons on the coast of Cornwall by Sir Frederic Leighton (1895)
- Alfred the Great repairing the walls of the City of London by Frank O. Salisbury (1912)
- William the Conqueror granting a Charter to the Citizens of London by John Seymour Lucas (1898)
- William II building the Tower of London by Charles Goldsborough Anderson (1911)
- King John sealing Magna Carta by Ernest Normand (1900)
- Sir Henry Picard, Master of the Vinters' Company entertaining Kings of England, France, Scotland Denmark & Cyprus by Albert Chevallier Tayler (1903)
- Sir Richard Whittington dispensing his Charities by Henrietta Rae (1900)
- Philip the Good presenting the charter to the Merchant Adventurers by Elijah Albert Cox (1916)
- Henry VI Battle of Barnet 1471, the Trained Bands marching to the support of Edward IV by John Henry Amschewitz (1911)
- Reconciliation of the Skinners & Merchant Taylors' Companies by Lord Mayor Billesden, 1484 by Edwin Austin Abbey (1904)
- The Crown offered to Richard III at Baynard's Castle by Sigismund Goetze (1898)
- The Foundation of St Paul's School, 1509 by William Frederick Yeames (1905)
- The Opening the first Royal Exchange by Queen Elizabeth I by Ernest Crofts (1899)
- Charles I demanding the Five Members at the Guildhall, 1641–42 by Solomon Joseph Solomon (1897)
- The Great Fire of London, 1666 by Stanhope Forbes (1899)
- Founding of the Bank of England, 27 July 1694 by George Harcourt (1904)
- Nelson leaving Portsmouth, 18 May 1803 by Andrew Carrick Gow (1903)
- Destruction of the Second Royal Exchange in 1838 by Stanhope Forbes (1899)
- Opening of the Royal Exchange by Her Majesty Queen Victoria, 28 October 1844 by Robert Walker Macbeth (1895)
- Women's Work in the Great War, 1914–1918 by Lucy Kemp-Welch (1922)
- Blocking of Zeebrugge Waterway, St George's Day, 23 April 1918 by William Lionel Wyllie (1920)
- Their Majesties King George V & Queen Mary visiting the Battle Districts in France, 1917 by Frank O. Salisbury (1917)
- National Peace Thanksgiving Service on the steps of St Paul's Cathedral, 6 July 1919 by Frank O. Salisbury (1919)
- Modern Commerce by Sir Frank Brangwyn (1906)

With the outbreak of the Second World War, trading at the Royal Exchange virtually ended. At war's end, the building had survived the Blitz, albeit with some near misses.

== Modern use ==
The courtyard of the Royal Exchange in 2026

In 1982 the Royal Exchange was in disrepair – in particular, the glass roof was in danger of collapse. The newly formed London International Financial Futures Exchange (LIFFE) was the main tenant, using the courtyard for the trading floor, all done without touching the framework of the original building. LIFFE moved to Cannon Bridge in 1991.

In 2001 the Royal Exchange (interiors and courtyard) was once again extensively remodelled, this time by architects Aukett Fitzroy Robinson. The works involved the restoration of the fabric of the building, a two floor office extension and replacement of the roof above the courtyard.

In a lane by the eastern entrance to the Royal Exchange, stand two statues: one of Paul Julius Reuter who founded his news agency there, and one of George Peabody who founded the Peabody Trust and a business which became J.P. Morgan & Co.

In 2013 a lease of Royal Exchange was sold by Anglo Irish Bank to Oxford Properties, a Canadian property company. It had been announced that the site would be sold with a 104-year lease. Oxford Properties Group, a division of the Ontario Municipal Employees Retirement System, bought the retail centre for a reported £86.5 million. In October 2022, Ardent UK acquired the retail element of the Exchange from Oxford Properties Group for around £50 million.

== See also ==
- London Troops War Memorial, located outside the Exchange
- St Bartholomew-by-the-Exchange

== Bibliography ==
- Mason, A. E. W. The Royal Exchange: a note on the occasion of the bicentenary of the Royal Exchange Assurance (London: Royal Exchange, 1920).
- W. H. Pyne. Microcosm of London; or, London in miniature, volume 3 (London Methuen, 1904) p. 17 ff.
- Thornbury, Walter. Old and new London: a narrative of its history, its people, and its places, volume 1 (London : Cassell, Petter, & Galpin, 1873) p. 494 ff.
