= Stereotypes of nurses =

Stereotypes related to nurses

A stereotype is a widely held and fixed notion of a specific type of person and is often oversimplified and can be offensive. Stereotypes of people and groups are harmful, especially when they lack factual information. Nursing as a profession has been stereotyped throughout history. The stereotypes given to nursing as well as women in nursing has been well documented. A common misconception is that all nurses are female; this misconception has led to the emergence of another stereotype that male nurses are effeminate. These generalized perceptions of the nursing profession have aided in the misrepresentation of nurses in the media as well as the mischaracterization of nurses in the eyes of the public. The image of a nurse depicted by the media is typically of a female being over-sexualized as well as diminished intellectually. This notion is then portrayed in get-well cards, television, film and books. The over-sexualized nurse is commonly referred to as a naughty nurse and is often seen as a sex symbol or nymphomaniac. Along with these common stereotypes, studies have identified several other popular images used in media such as handmaiden, angel, torturer, homosexual male, alcoholic, buffoon and woman in white. Common stereotypes of nursing and portrayal of these misrepresentations have fueled a discussion on the effects they have on the profession.

== History ==
In the 19th century and early 20th century, the image of a nurse was typically that of the angelic and serving female. At this point in time, there was conflict between the idea of nursing as woman's work and as skilled labor requiring immense training. Nursing was initially considered a woman's job because it constituted domestic labor. The American Civil War (1861–1865) has been thought to be a turning point for this stereotype. In the 1860s, middle-class white women volunteered to be aides in the war effort. These women worked in unsanitary and undersupplied conditions within medical facilities. After returning home from the war these women would contend that adequate care required adequate knowledge, and thus formal training (Nursing Training Programs) needed to be implemented.

It has been argued that images circulating of white women participating in nursing work in the south on southern plantations take away from the reality of slaves doing most of the everyday tasks pertaining to the health of both slaves and slave owners. However, in both instances the work is being completed by a woman. Post establishment of Nurse Training Programs, concerns became apparent relating to race and socioeconomic class. This concern was in the schools not wanting to besmirch their reputations by teaching poor women or women of color. Black medical and training facilities were established to serve the black community. While women were able to now seek education in nursing as well as jobs, race and class divisions remained.

Subsequently nurses began to be portrayed as sexy pin-up versions of what was earlier described in other media, television and books. Images seen in modern and pop culture show still sexualized ideals of nurses while attempting to dismantle the misrepresentation and go against the stereotype. Images today still show a sexualized ideal when the "sexy nurse" costume comes back every year for Halloween. It has also been portrayed in TV shows such as Married... with Children, Animaniacs, and to a lesser extent Grey's Anatomy. In keeping with a tradition of sexy women adorning the backglasses of many pinball games, an attractive, big-busted blonde in a nurse costume was shown in the 1989 pinball game Dr. Dude and his X-Cellent Ray. Don Imus, in a 1993 broadcast following his recovery from surgery, admitted during his hospitalization he saw the reality of those employed in healthcare as immigrant orderlies and middle-aged women in hospital scrubs, and joked "not many girls gave up modeling careers to go to nursing school".

Other stereotypes of nurses have persisted in that girls from poor families enter into a nursing career in order to lasso a doctor husband, which was featured in the comic strip Momma, when the daughter considered applying to nursing school, the titular character considered it her long-awaited chance to marry off her daughter to a successful professional. The stereotype was also used on an episode of Doogie Howser, M.D. where Dr. Pressman was disciplined over getting in a fistfight with an arrogant young doctor, who had made a remark that Nurse Spalding was not valued for her professional skills but that she was meant to be on the arm of the young hotshot.

== Nurses as selfless and angelic ==
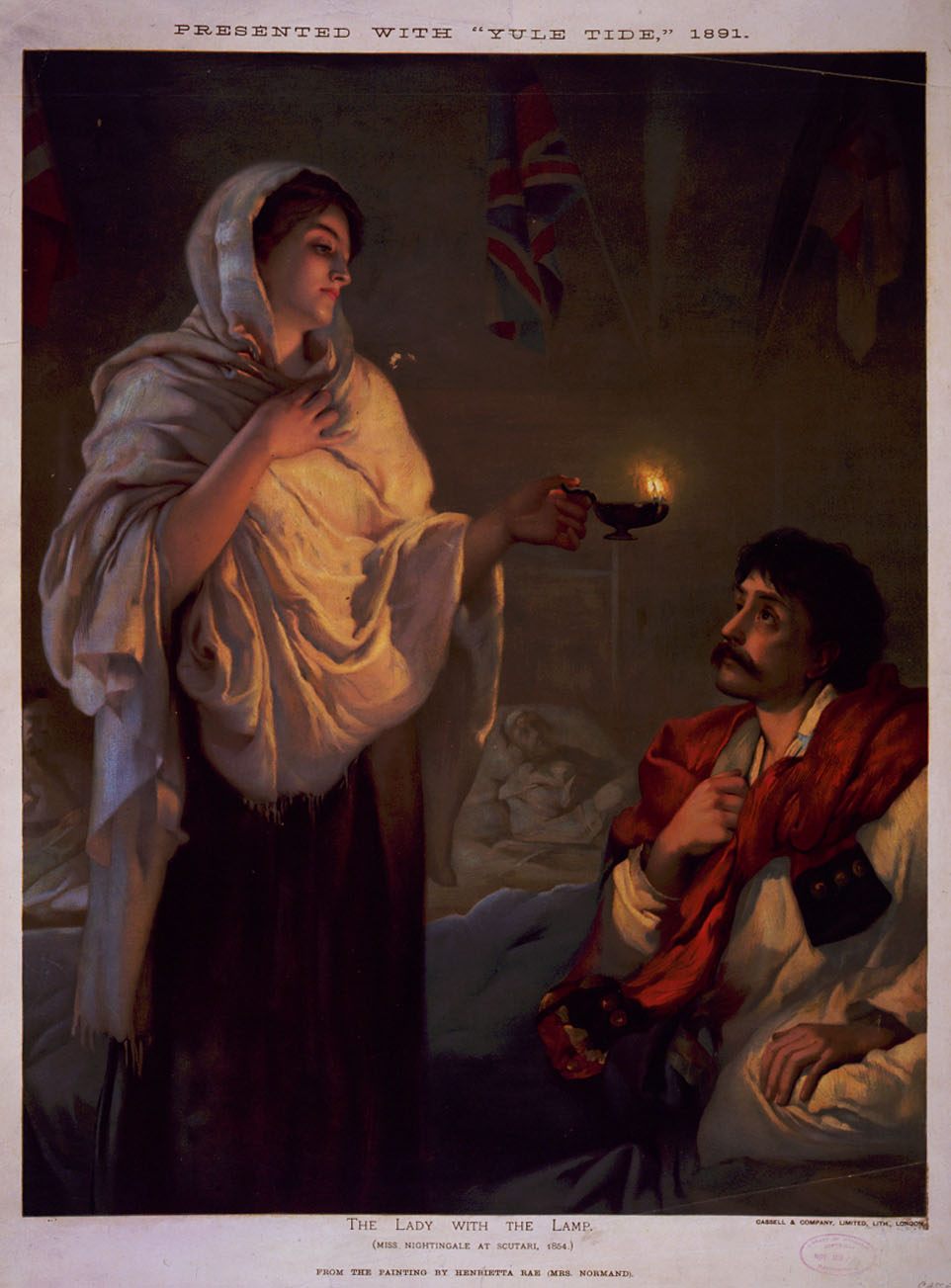
The Lady with the Lamp — Florence Nightingale at Scutari in 1891 painted by Henrietta Rae

The image of a nurse as a ministering angel was promoted in the 19th century in an attempt to counter the then widely popular image of a nurse being depicted as a dissolute drunk. The image of a drunk nurse was exemplified by Dickens' Sarah Gamp. The nurse in this image is depicted as a moral, noble and religious being who was devout like a nun—chaste and abstemious - as opposed to the resemblance that of a witch. Her skills would be practical and her demeanor would be stoic and obedient. Florence Nightingale also known as The Lady with the Lamp, promoted this image due to the fact that during the Crimean War, she was known to make rounds at night, treating wounds and giving care to soldiers. The angelic image that comes to mind when a woman with a lamp approaches an injured soldier is not far fetched. This is where much of the selfless angelic image of nurses come from. The idea of female nurses attending the British Army fighting in the war was controversial, due to it being thought immoral as well as revolutionary.

== Harmful effects ==
The media has a strong influence on public views, shaping the way the public values and treats professions in healthcare. In the book Saving Lives: Why the Media's Portrayal Nurses Puts Us All At Risk, Sandy Summers and Harry Jacobs discuss the many ill effects of the common stereotypes and how those are presented in today's media. They argue that offensive stereotypes (such as handmaidens) and sexual stereotypes lead media to overlook how important nurses are in healthcare. This in turn generates a lack of respect. Many people (but not all) do not know what the scope of practice and care of nursing entails, and are thus prone to being misled by stereotypes. The ignorance of and disrespect for nurses' work hinders their ability to do their jobs and puts lives at risk. Stephanie Sauvinet, a nursing professional who advocates for accurate representation of nurses, said that misrepresentations promote distrust and a lack of respect for nurses, who are perceived as 'less-educated':

Instead of fostering the important concept of teamwork by portraying medical professionals as separate moving parts that lead to effective medical care, the misrepresentation of nurses concocts an atmosphere of friction, disorganization, and unfounded conflict that drives current and future patients to distrust their medical professional.

This has impact on the individual pride of the nurse as well. It may lead a nurse to believe they are working for physicians rather than with them. It may also discourage nurses from standing their ground or demanding respect and professionalism.

== Misrepresentations in the media ==
Movies and television shows typically do not accurately portray the job that a nurse does, often having nurses be the backdrop for scenes rather than a part of them. Also, another common misrepresentation is having doctors perform nursing tasks which makes them look more—and the nurses less—competent and thus unneeded. The Truth About Nursing explains that physicians being presented carrying out such tasks as "triage, patient teaching, giving medications, providing psycho-social support, minute-to-minute care of the critically ill, and preventative care such as vaccinations.” The reality is that nurses are actually advocates for their patients as well as patient educators. They explain different treatments and procedures to their patients as well as protecting their patients interests.

== See also ==
- History of nursing
- Heart Attack Grill
- Battle-axe (woman)
- List of fictional nurses
- Nurse paintings
