= Cartwright Hall =

Art gallery in Bradford, West Yorkshire, England

Coordinates: 53.81205°N 1.77163°W

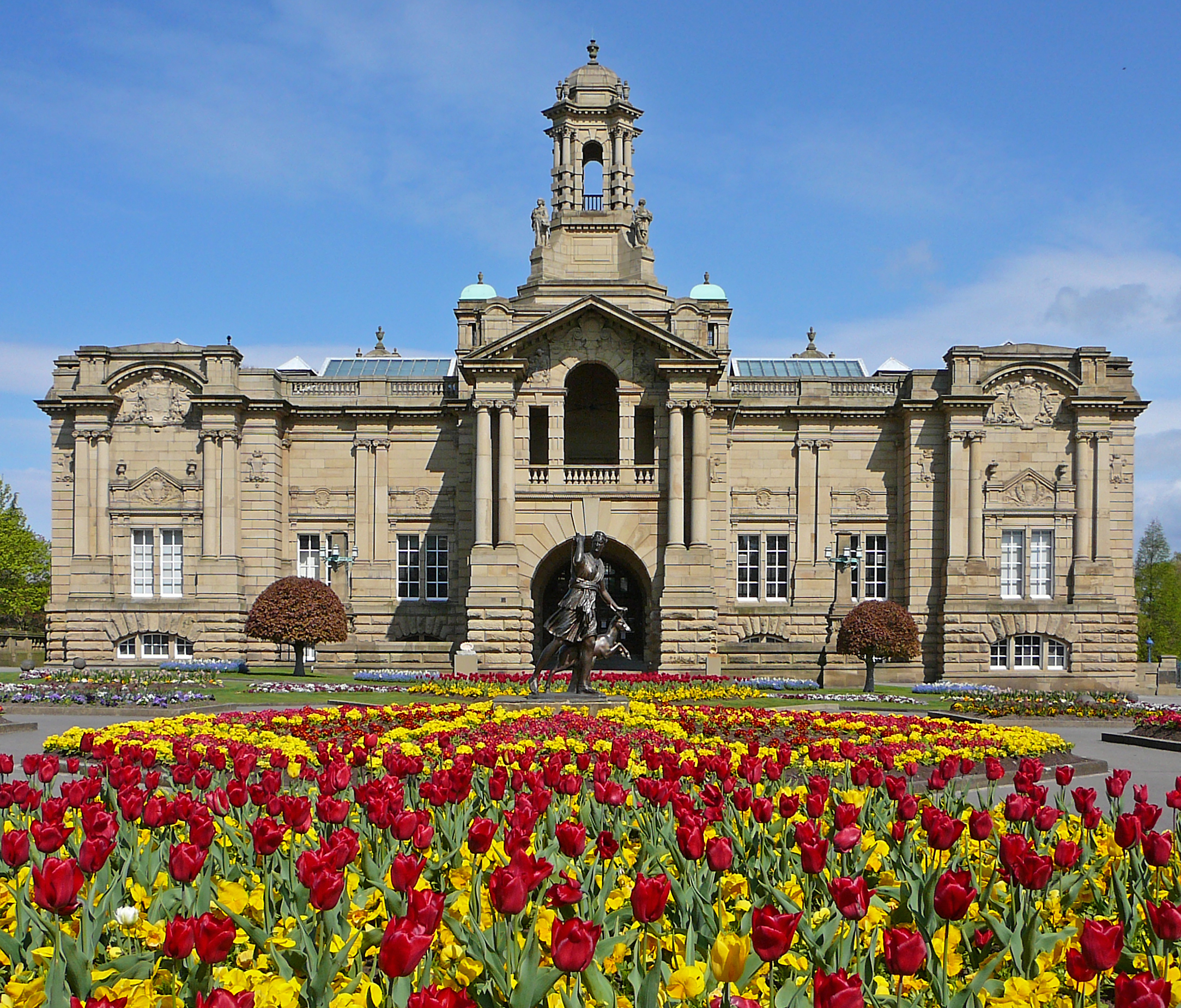
Cartwright Hall, Lister Park, Bradford

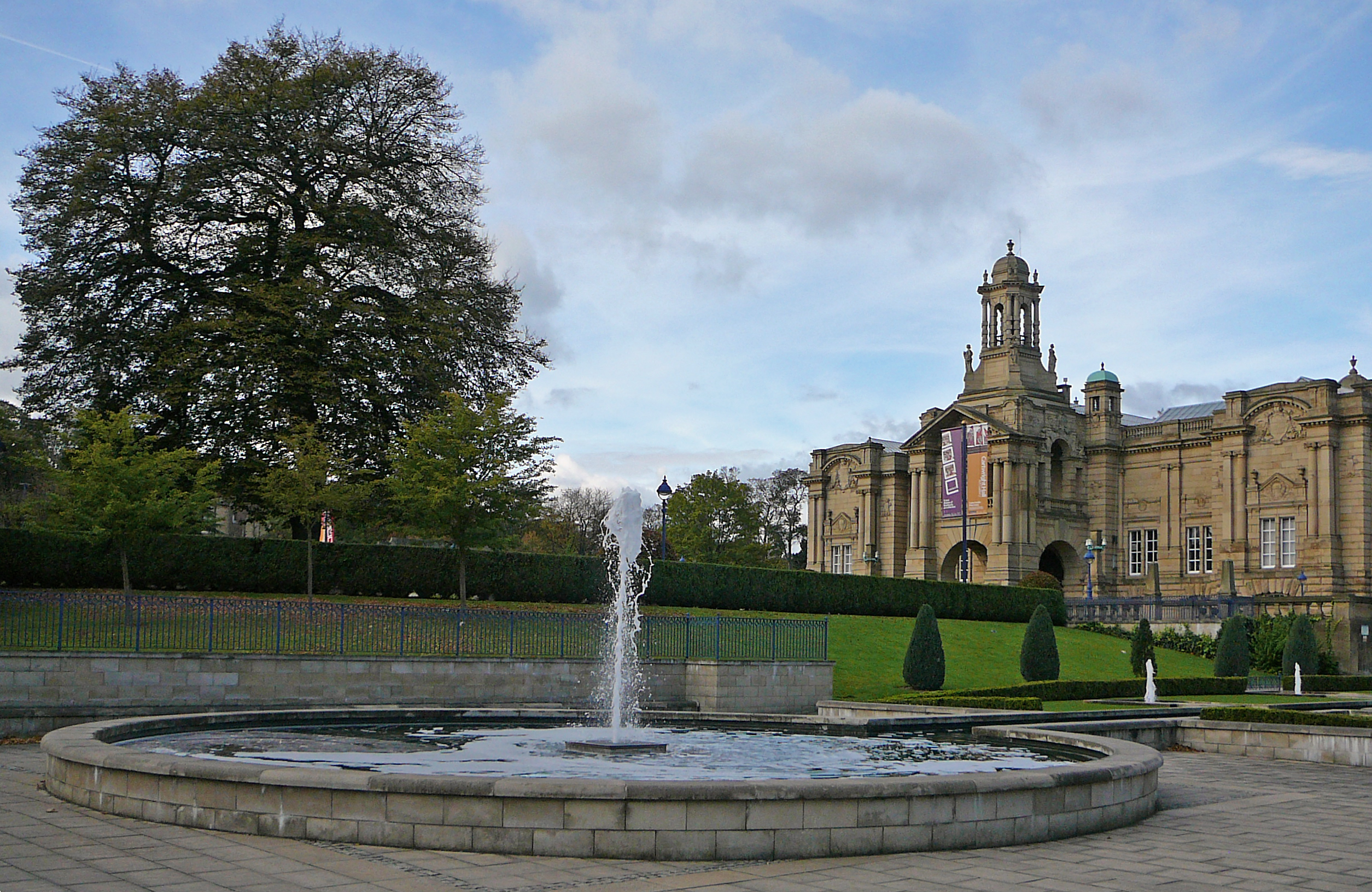
Cartwright Hall and grounds

Cartwright Hall is the civic art gallery in Bradford, West Yorkshire, England, situated about a mile from the city centre in the Manningham district. It was built on the former site of Manningham Hall using a gift of £40,000 donated by Samuel Lister and it is named after Edmund Cartwright. The gallery which opened in 1904 initially had a display of artworks loaned from other galleries and private collections until it was able to purchase a permanent collection of Victorian and Edwardian works using money raised by the 1904 Bradford Exhibition.

Cartwright Hall stands in Lister Park and enjoys scenic views of the city. Cartwright Hall has been held to represent "Bradford Baroque", a style of architecture typical of Bradford. It is however designed by the same architects as Glasgow's Kelvingrove Art Gallery and Museum (Sir John W. Simpson and E.J. Milner Allen), also in the Baroque style.

The purpose-built gallery is home to a collection of permanent works, from Old Masters to 20th-century British paintings and sculpture. Cartwright Hall also has a biennial open exhibition and contemporary and historical exhibitions by local, national and international artists. Since the mid 1980s the Bradford museum group has collected works that are associated with the cultural background of many post-war migrants to the Bradford area. Acquisitions include contemporary South Asian Art - Islamic calligraphy, phulkari style illustrated textiles and items of contemporary Sikh art, including a portrait of Guru Nanak.

In 1983 Cartwright Hall was briefly used as part of the musical number Every Sperm is Sacred in the Monty Python film, The Meaning of Life.

In 2003 an Unreal Tournament map was created featuring the inside of the hall as part of a contest for PC Format Magazine.

In 2025, the art gallery displayed the 2025 Turner Prize exhibition. The exhibition attracted 36,000 visitors in 2025.

== Notable holdings ==
- Tristram and Isoude stained-glass panels, by Morris, Marshall, Faulkner & Co., 1862. Acquired via Cartwright Hall in 1917, they are now permanently on display at Cliffe Castle Museum, Keighley (also run by Bradford Museums and Galleries)

== Notable staff ==
- Nima Poovaya-Smith, curator

== Gallery ==
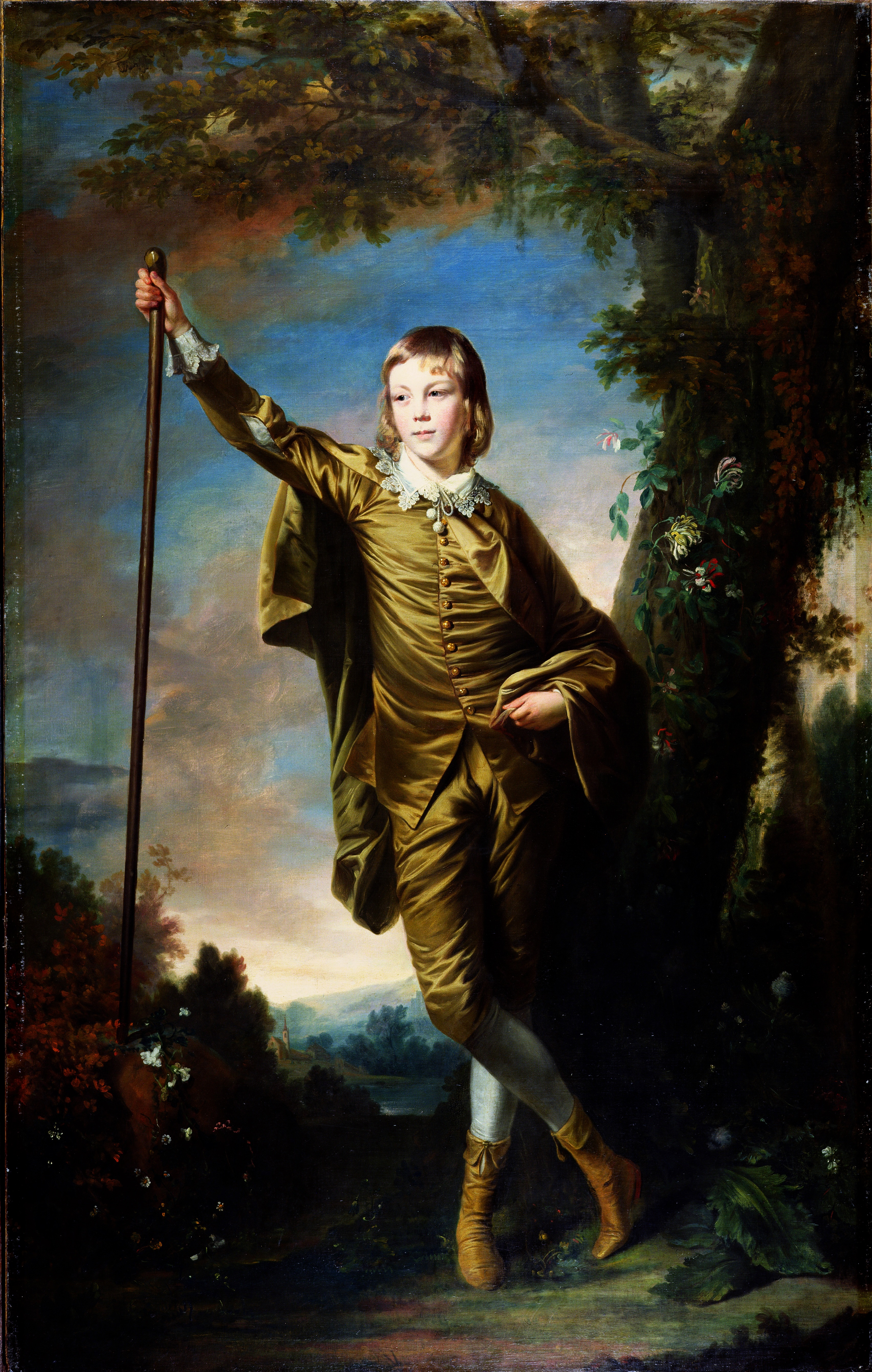
The Brown Boy by Joshua Reynolds, 1764

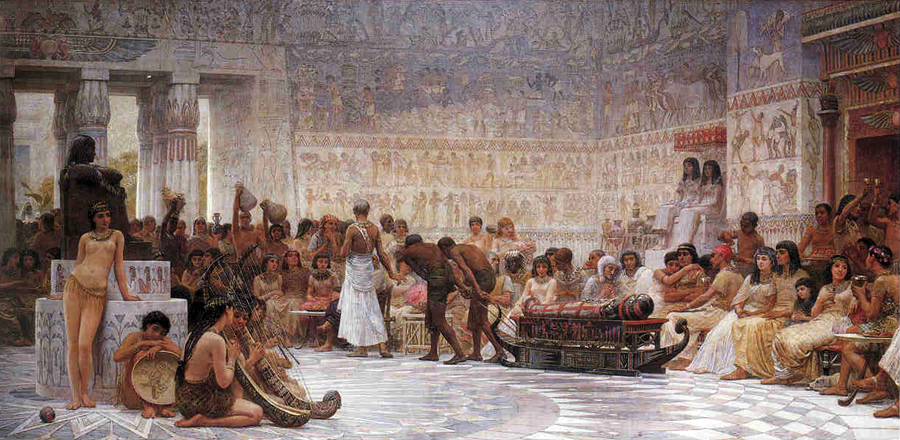
An Egyptian Feast by Edwin Long, 1877

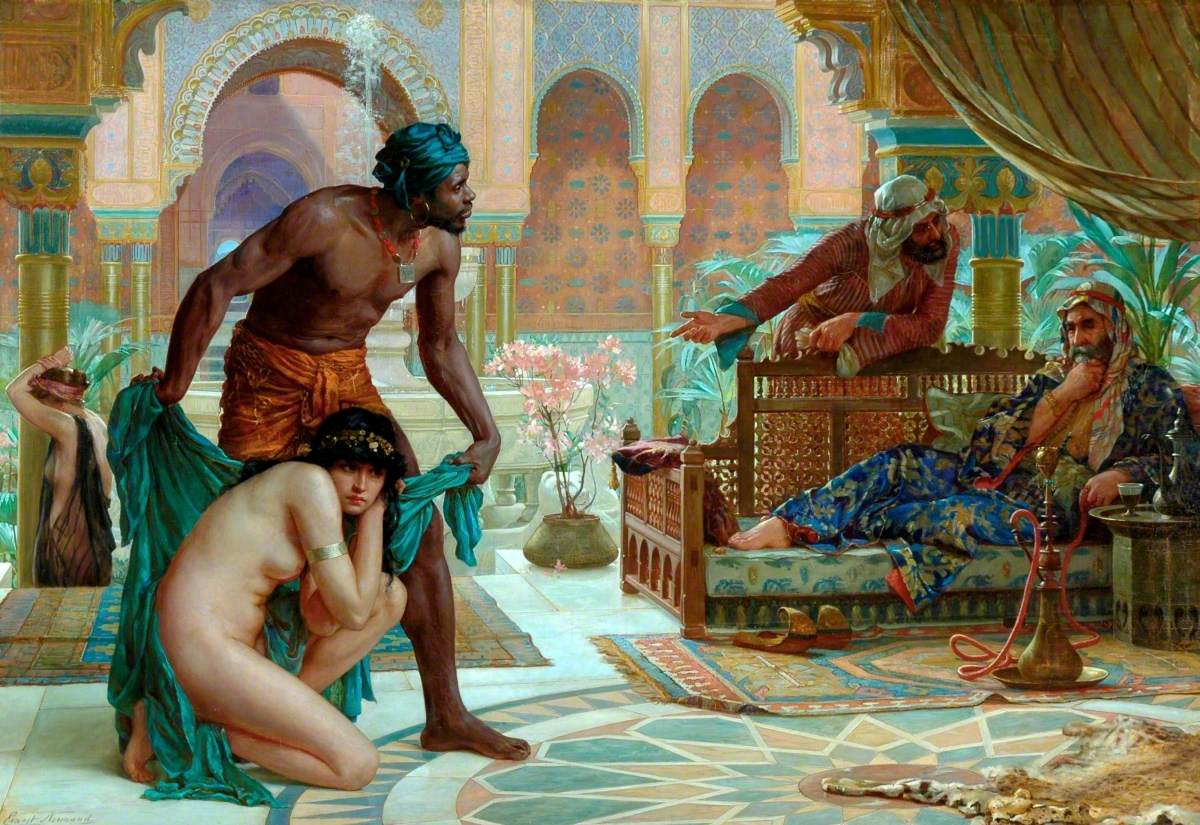
The Bitter Draught of Slavery by Ernest Normand, 1885

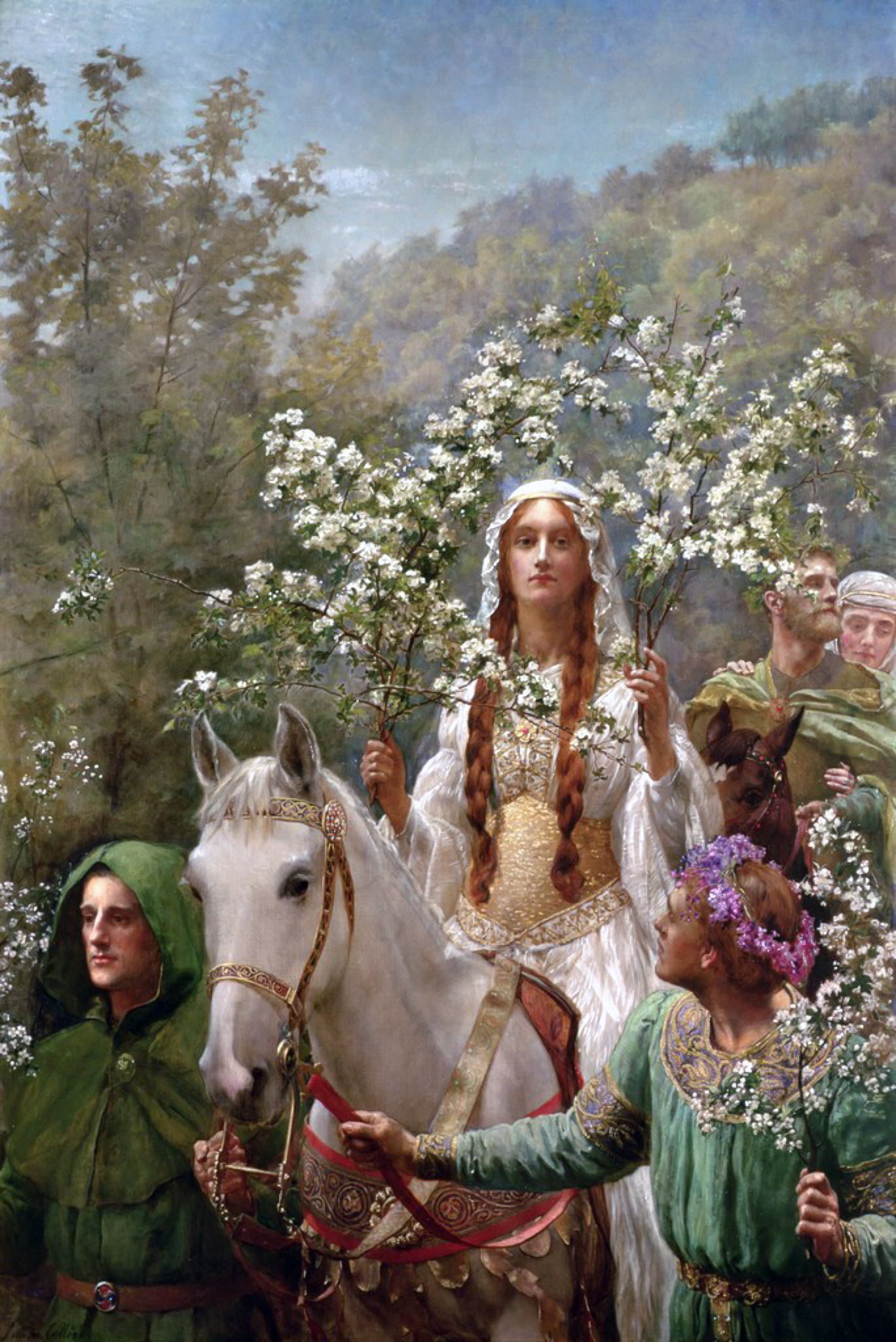
Queen Guinevere's Maying by John Collier, 1897

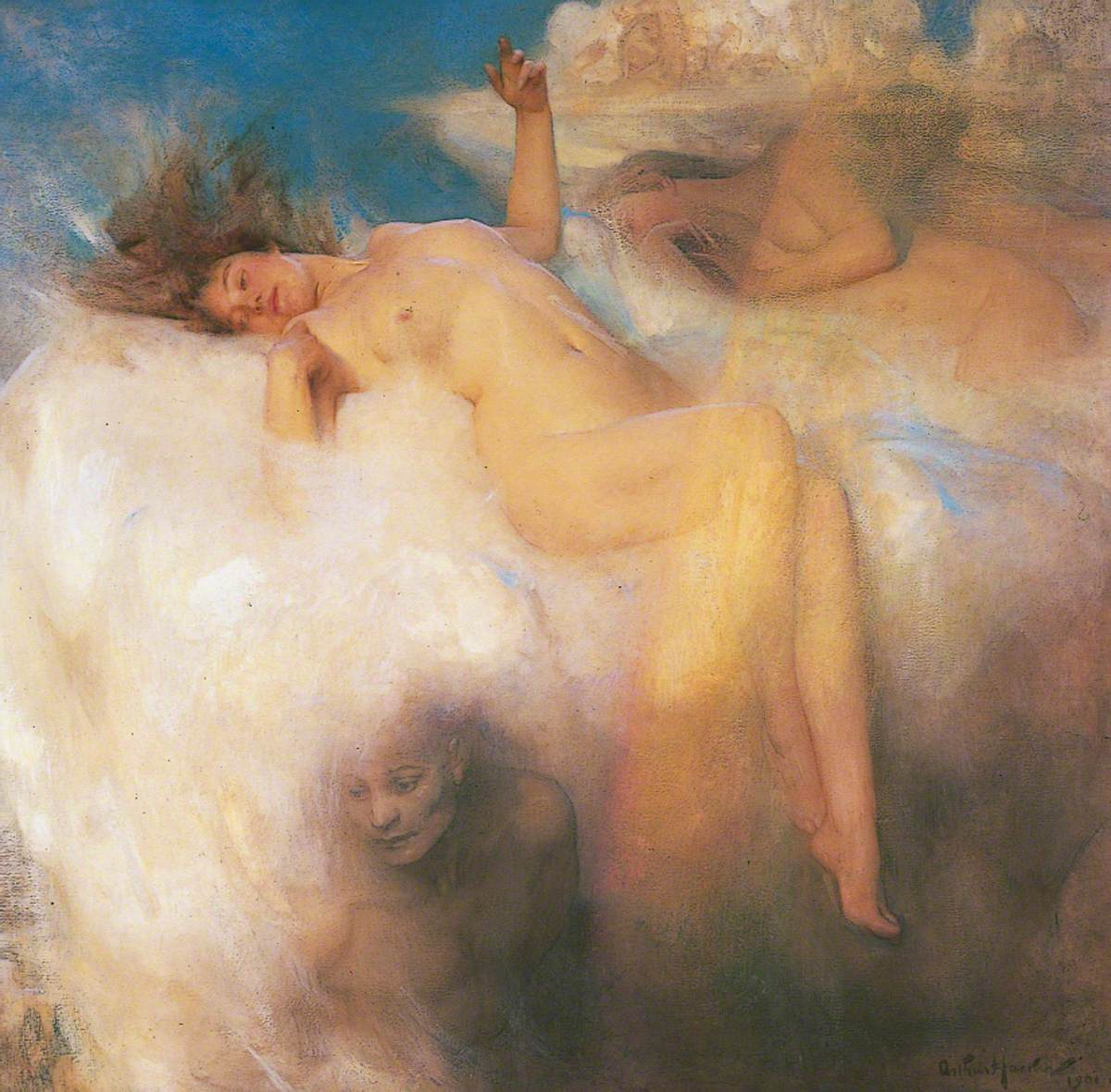
The Cloud by Arthur Hacker, 1901

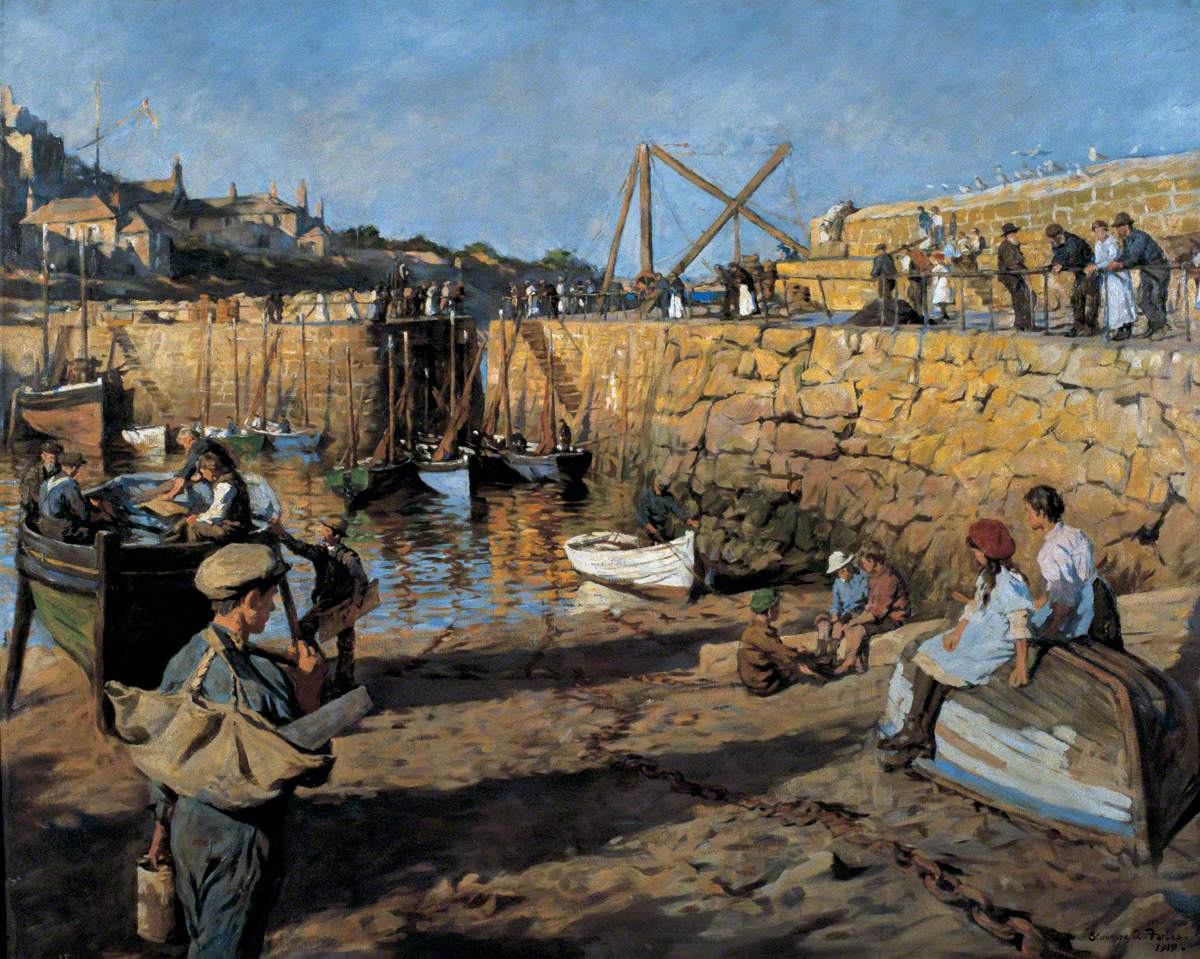
Fitting Out, Mousehole Harbour by Stanhope Forbes, 1919

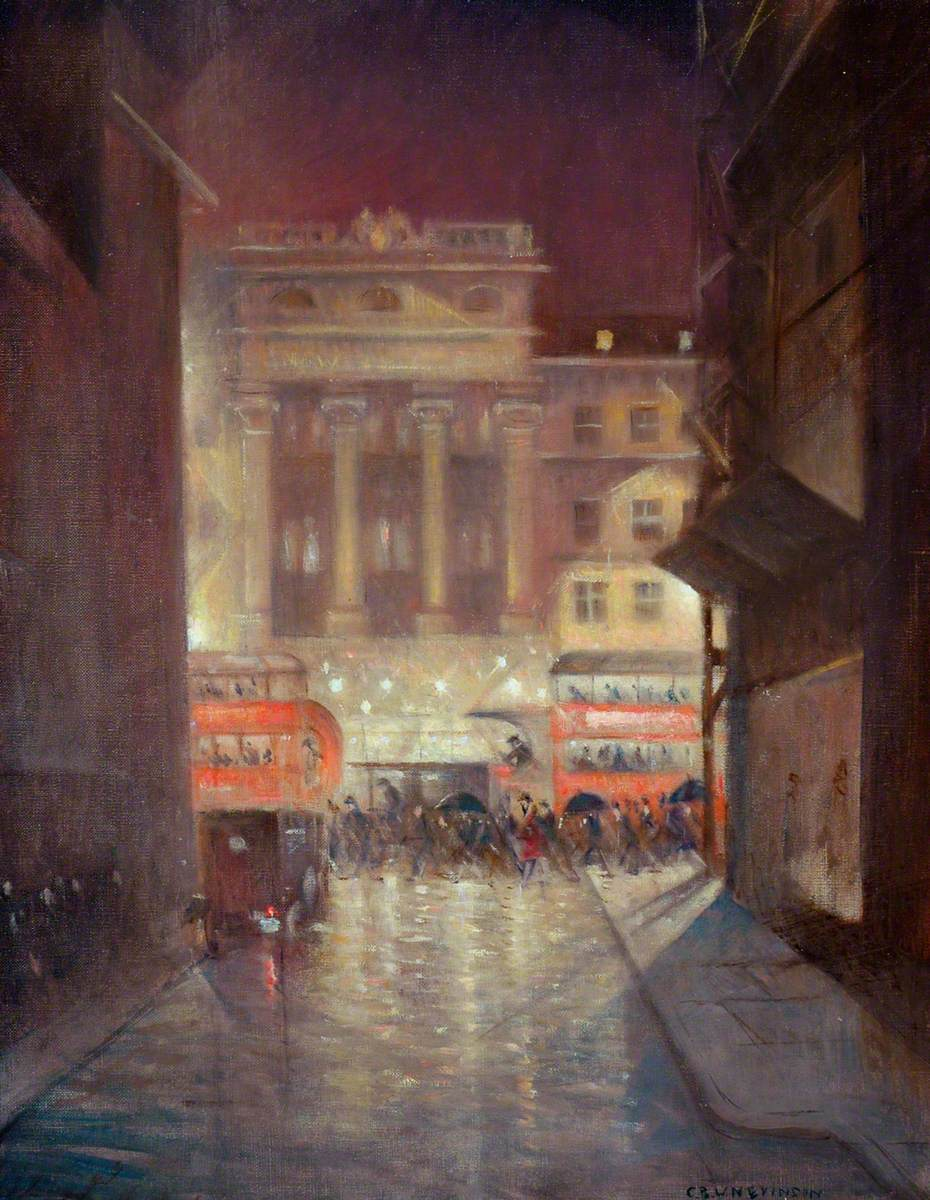
The Strand by Night by C.R.W. Nevinson, 1937

== See also ==
- Bradford District Museums & Galleries
- Listed buildings in Bradford (Manningham Ward)
