= Nima Poovaya-Smith =

Museum curator, art historian and writer

Nima Poovaya-Smith OBE
- Born: 1953 (age 72–73)
- Occupations: Curator, art historian, writer

Dr Ammanichanda Nima Poovaya-Smith OBE is a museum curator, art historian and writer. She is known for her work on transcultural and post-colonial South Asian museum collections in Bradford.

== Early life and education ==
Poovaya-Smith was born in Coorg in Karnataka and was educated in Belgaum. Her father worked in the silk industry and her mother was artistic. Poovaya-Smith studied for a PhD in English Literature at the University of Mysore. Poovaya-Smith came to Britain in 1981 to study at the University of Leeds. Her original research interest was Margaret Atwood.

== Career ==
Poovaya-Smith was appointed curator at the Cartwright Hall civic art gallery in Bradford in 1986 "with the remit of building up, and displaying, a collection of art from the Indo-Pakistan subcontinent". At that time she was one of very few Black and Minority Ethnic people working in museums in the UK. She has said that "if these works [by Black and Asian artists] are not captured in public collections then there’s going to be a huge distortion of history".

Poovaya-Smith developed the Transcultural Galleries at Cartwright Hall, which in 2008 became the Connect galleries. Her aim was to attract South Asian people to the galleries. She described the Transcultural Galleries as "the first non-colonial exhibition of its kind in the country". She held the post at Cartwright Hall until 1998, and developed "one of the most significant collections of contemporary art in the UK by artists from south Asian, African and Caribbean heritages". Exhibitions included one on calligraphy, Speaking Art, and another on Sikh art and culture, Warm, Rich and Fearless (1991). The displays were noted for their difference from traditional museum formats: "thematic, non-hierarchical, non-linear".

In 1998 Poovaya-Smith became Director of the Arts Council Yorkshire. She held that post until 2002.

From 2002 to 2004 Poovaya-Smith was head of special projects at the National Museum of Photography, Film & Television in Bradford.

She runs an arts company, Alchemy Anew. She has also written poetry for performance.

In 2020 a textile exhibition at Two Temple Place included work collected by Poovaya-Smith.

Poovaya-Smith was appointed an Officer of the Order of the British Empire (OBE) in the 2016 Birthday Honours for services to Arts and Museums in Yorkshire.

In 2020 she became one of the Deputy lieutenants of West Yorkshire.

In 2022 Poovaya-Smith published a book of poetry, The Wild Cats Compendium.

== Personal life ==
Poovaya-Smith is married to Paul Smith, a sociologist.

== Publications ==
- "Exhibitions and audiences: catering for a pluralistic public", in Museum Languages, Objects and Texts, ed. Gaynor Kavanagh (1991)
- Warm and Rich and Fearless: A Brief Survey of the Sikh Culture: a Catalogue Produced to Accompany the Exhibition Warm and Rich and Fearless, an Exhibition of Sikh Art, Cartwright Hall (9 March - 2 June 1991), with Khushwant Singh and Kaveri Ponnapa (1991)
- "Confessions of an Indolent Curator", Kunapipi, 19(3), 1997
- "Making Culturally Diverse Histories", with Nick Merriman, in Making Histories in Museums, ed. Gaynor Kavanagh (2005)
- The Wild Cats Compendium (2022)
