= The Bitter Draught of Slavery =

Painting by Ernest Normand

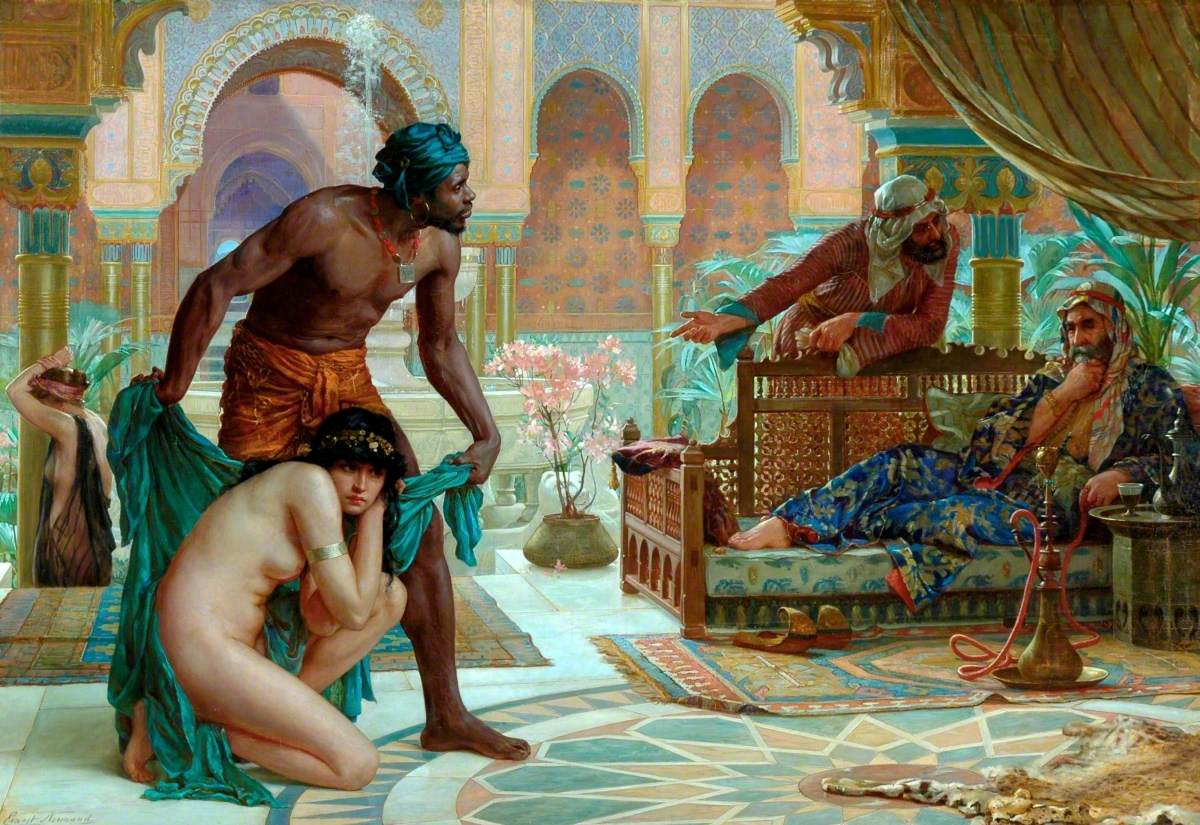
- Artist: Ernest Normand
- Year: 1885
- Type: Oil on canvas, genre painting
- Dimensions: 136.5 cm × 197.5 cm (53.7 in × 77.8 in)
- Location: Cartwright Hall, Bradford

The Bitter Draught of Slavery is an 1885 oil painting by the British artist Ernest Normand. It depicts a young woman nude captive being offered for sale to potentate somewhere in the Middle East. This was part of a fashionable trend for such Orientalist scenes at the time. Stylistically it is strongly influenced by similar French paintings. The title The Bitter Draught of Slavery has its origins in the 1768 novel A Sentimental Journey by Laurence Sterne.

The painting was displayed at the Royal Academy Exhibition of 1885 held at Burlington House in London. The picture is now in the collection of Cartwright Hall in Bradford, having been acquired in 1936.

== Bibliography ==
- Dakers, Caroline. The Holland Park Circle: Artists and Victorian Society. Yale University Pressz 1999.
- Smith, Alison. The Victorian Nude: Sexuality, Morality and Art. Manchester University Press, 1996.
