= The Strand by Night =

Painting by C.R.W. Nevinson

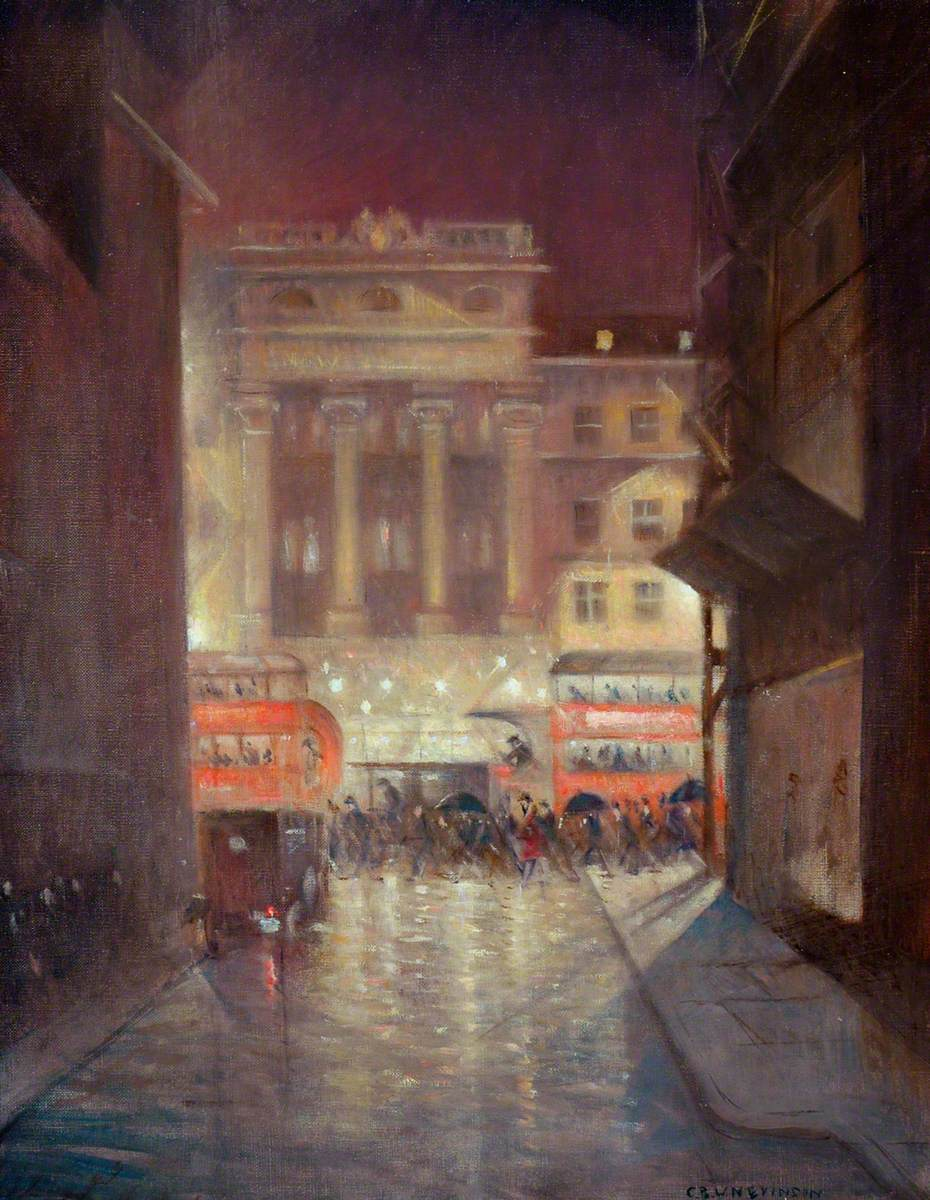
- Artist: C.R.W. Nevinson
- Year: 1934
- Type: Oil on canvas, cityscape painting
- Dimensions: 76 cm × 61 cm (30 in × 24 in)
- Location: Cartwright Hall, Bradford

The Strand by Night is an oil painting on canvas by the British artist C.R.W. Nevinson, from 1934.

== History and description ==
A cityscape, it shows a view of the Strand in London seen from a sidestreet on a rainy night. Red London Buses and pedestrians with umbrellas pass by on the bustling thoroughfare.

Before the First World War, Nevinson had been a key figure in the Futurism movement. However, in the interwar years many of his paintings became more Impressionist and realist in style. It was exhibited at the New English Art Club in 1934. The painting is part of the collection of Cartwright Hall in Bradford, having been bought directly from the artist in 1937.}

== Bibliography ==
- Browell, Geoff & Chanin, Eileen. The Strand: A Biography. Manchester University Press, 2025.
- Ingleby, Richard. C.R.W. Nevinson: The Twentieth Century. Merrell Holberton, 1999.
- Roe, Sonia. Oil Paintings in Public Ownership in West Yorkshire. Public Catalogue Foundation, 2007.
