= Battle-axe (woman) =

Archetypal virago

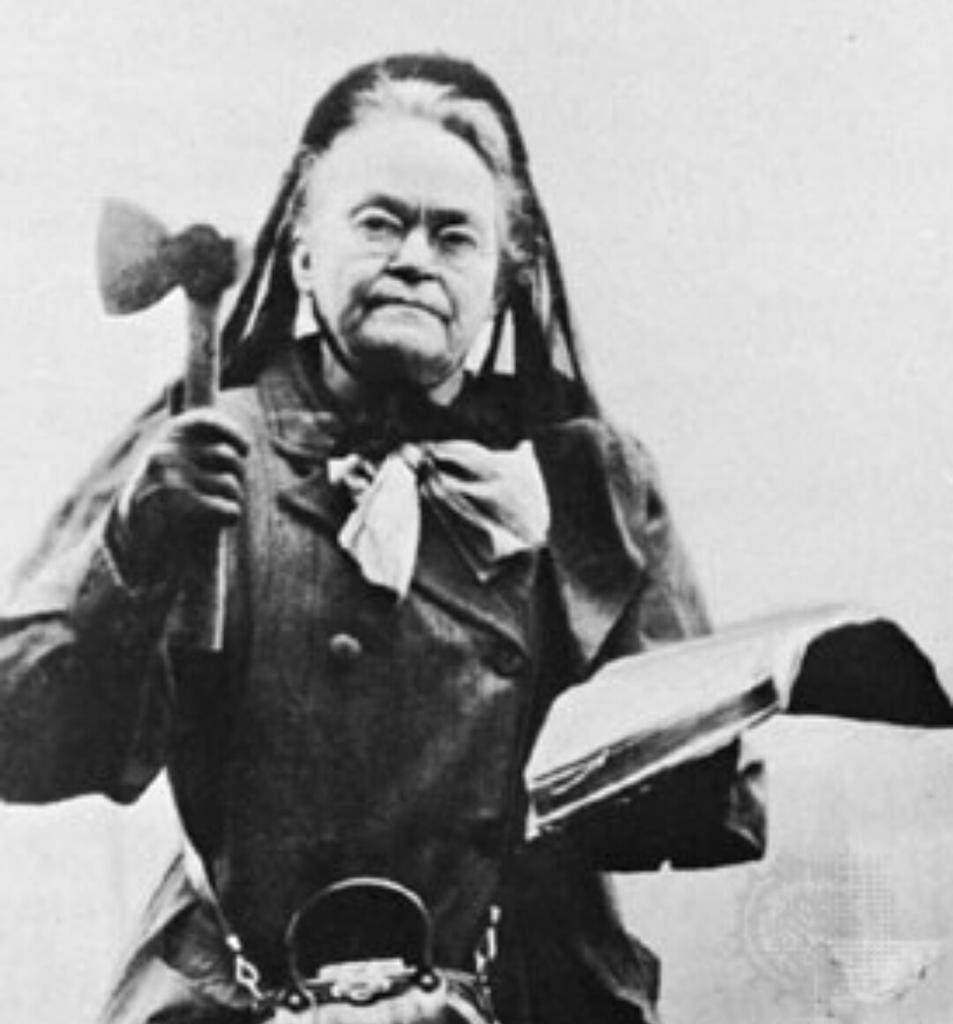
Carrie Nation, brandishing a hatchet

A battle-axe (or battle-ax) is a derogatory traditional stereotype describing a woman characterized as aggressive, overbearing, and forceful. The term originated as a gender-independent descriptor in the early 20th century, but became primarily applied to women around the middle of the century. The first attested source in the Oxford English Dictionary is from the book Artie by George Ade

Say, there was a battle-ax if ever you see one. She had a face on her that'd fade flowers.

== Battle-axe in popular culture ==
The prime example was the militant temperance activist Carrie Nation, who actually wielded a hatchet and made it her symbol, living in Hatchet Hall and publishing a magazine called The Hatchet. She became involved in the suffragette campaign for votes for women and this campaign further established the archetype.

The battleaxe is one of several stereotypes found in nursing – a tyrannical, fierce matron exemplified by Nurse Ratched or Hattie Jacques in popular medical dramas and comedies. Judith Furse played a "battle-axe woman" in the film Carry On Cabby.

Another example of the battleaxe in popular culture is in soap operas, for which the "quintessential archetype" was Violet Carson, who played Ena Sharples in the world's longest-running television soap opera, Coronation Street.

== See also ==
- Fishwife
- Jeanne Hachette
- Karen (slang)
- Labrys (double-axe) as a feminist symbol
- Termagant
- Virago
