= Queen Guinevere's Maying =

Painting by John Collier

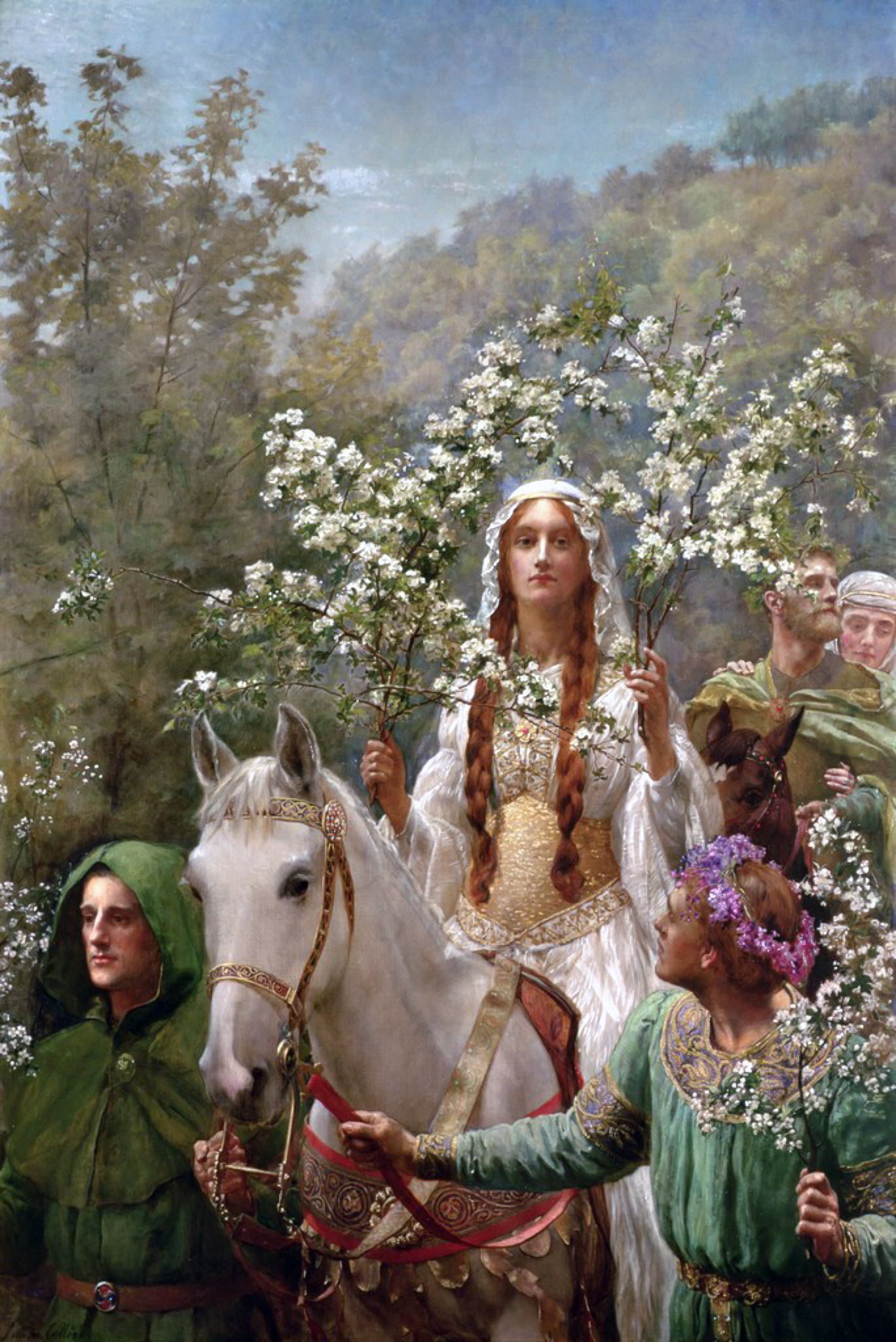
- Artist: John Collier
- Year: 1897
- Type: Oil on canvas, history painting
- Dimensions: 180.5 cm × 121 cm (71.1 in × 48 in)
- Location: Cartwright Hall, Bradford

Queen Guinevere's Maying is an 1897 oil painting by the British artist John Collier. It depicts Guinevere the wife of King Arthur taking part in May Day festivities. Collier drew his inspiration from Alfred Tennyson's Idylls of the King which was in turn strongly influenced by Thomas Malory's fifteenth century work Le Morte d'Arthur. The scene of Guinevere's Maying was a subject into the Victorian era.

The picture was displayed at the New Gallery Exhibition in 1897 at Regent Street in London. Originally purchased by William Rawlings, it is now in the collection of Cartwright Hall in Bradford which acquired it in 1928 as a gift of Rawlings daughters after his death.

== Bibliography ==
- Mancoff, Debra N. The Return of King Arthur: The Legend Through Victorian Eyes. H.N. Abrams, 1995.
- Pollock, Walter Herries. The Art of John Collier. Virtue & Company, 1914.
- Reeves, Compton Biggs, Douglas & Michalove, Sharon (ed.) Reputation and Representation in Fifteenth-Century Europe. Brilliant, 2004.
- Roe, Sonia. Oil Paintings in Public Ownership in West Yorkshire. Public Catalogue Foundation, 2007.
