= Kaveri Ponnapa =

Indian author

Kaveri Ponnapa is an author and writer on Kodava culture and food. Her scholarly work, The Vanishing Kodavas was published in 2013 after about 15 years of research.

== Education ==
Ponnapa studied at Lady Shriram College, Delhi. She did her post graduation in Anthropology from Londonat the School of Oriental and African Studies.

== Biography ==
She also translated Kodava poems in the book, A place apart - Poems from Kodagu. She has written other books and also runs a popular blog, "The Coorg Table".^{[4]} Her grandparents, who left Kodagu when they are young, returned to their ancestral house from Andaman and Nicobar Islands after retirement. Before writing her book, The Vanishing Kodavas, she spent huge amount of time in the villages of Coorg to experience the local customs and food habits. Many of her research papers were published in national and international publications.

She has also curated many food festivals in top hotels across the country.
