= Miss Nightingale at Scutari, 1854 =

1891 painting by Henrietta Rae

- The Lady with the Lamp
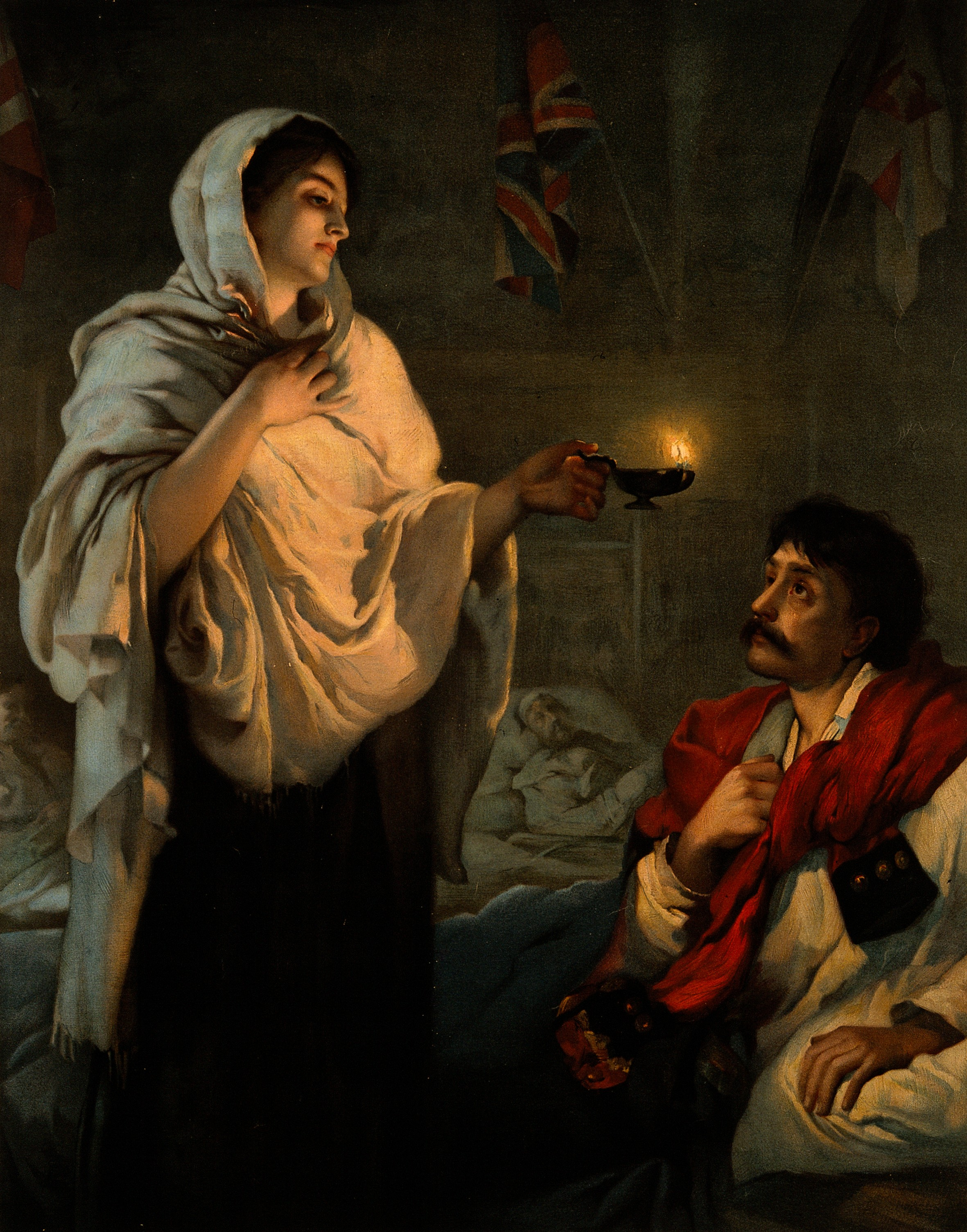
- Lithograph of Miss Nightingale at Scutari, 1854
- Artist: Henrietta Rae
- Year: 1891
- Subject: Florence Nightingale at Scutari Hospital

Miss Nightingale at Scutari, 1854, also known as The Lady with the Lamp, is an 1891 painting by Henrietta Rae. It depicts Florence Nightingale at Scutari Hospital during the Crimean War.

The painting is a romanticised three-quarter-length portrait of Nightingale, depicted as a young woman swathed in a white shawl, carrying an oil lamp as she looks down on a wounded British soldier, wearing his redcoat draped over his shoulders with its arms around his neck. Other wounded soldiers lie in the background, below military flags.

The painting was commissioned by the publishers Cassell & Co for reproduction as a chromolithograph with their "Yule Tide" Christmas annual, in 1891, entitled "The Lady with the Lamp".

The location of the original oil painting is not known.
