= Ernest Normand =

English painter (1857–1923)

- Born: 30 December 1857; London, England
- Died: 23 March 1923 (aged 65); London, England
- Education: Académie Julian, Paris
- Known for: Painter
- Movement: Orientalist; Victorian painting
- Spouse(s): Henrietta Rae painter and writer (1859–1928)

Ernest Normand (1857-1923) was an English painter noted for his historical and Biblical scenes as well as Orientalist works.

== Life and career ==
Ernest Normand was born in London on 30 December 1857. He painted history and orientalist paintings, and also undertook portraits.

In 1884 he married the painter and writer, Henrietta Rae (1859-1928). They both painted nude figures in lush settings, and were criticized for an apparent tendency toward an excess of sensuality in some of their paintings.

The Normands were based in London from 1885, where Ernest had his studio and received support from the circle around Lord Leighton. They lived in Holland Park, an area known as the residence of many other artists of the day. Frequent visitors to their home included Leighton, Millais, Prinsep, and Watts. These more senior artists adopted the Normands, but their criticism was not always welcome. In her memoirs, Henrietta described the overbearing attitudes and conduct of some of the more senior artists.

In 1890, the Normands travelled to Paris to study at the Académie Julian with Jules Joseph Lefebvre and Jean-Joseph Benjamin-Constant. In 1893, the Normands moved to Upper Norwood, into a studio that was custom-built for them by Normand's father. The couple had two children, a son (born in 1886) and a daughter (born in 1893).

Normand's cremated remains were buried in a small vault beneath one of two stelea outside the Normand mausoleum in Brookwood Cemetery, Surrey.

== Work ==
He painted history and orientalist paintings, and also undertook portraits. His work was influenced by the Pre-Raphaelites. Normand painted the "King John Granting the Magna Carta" fresco at the Royal Exchange in London (painted 1900, restored 2001).

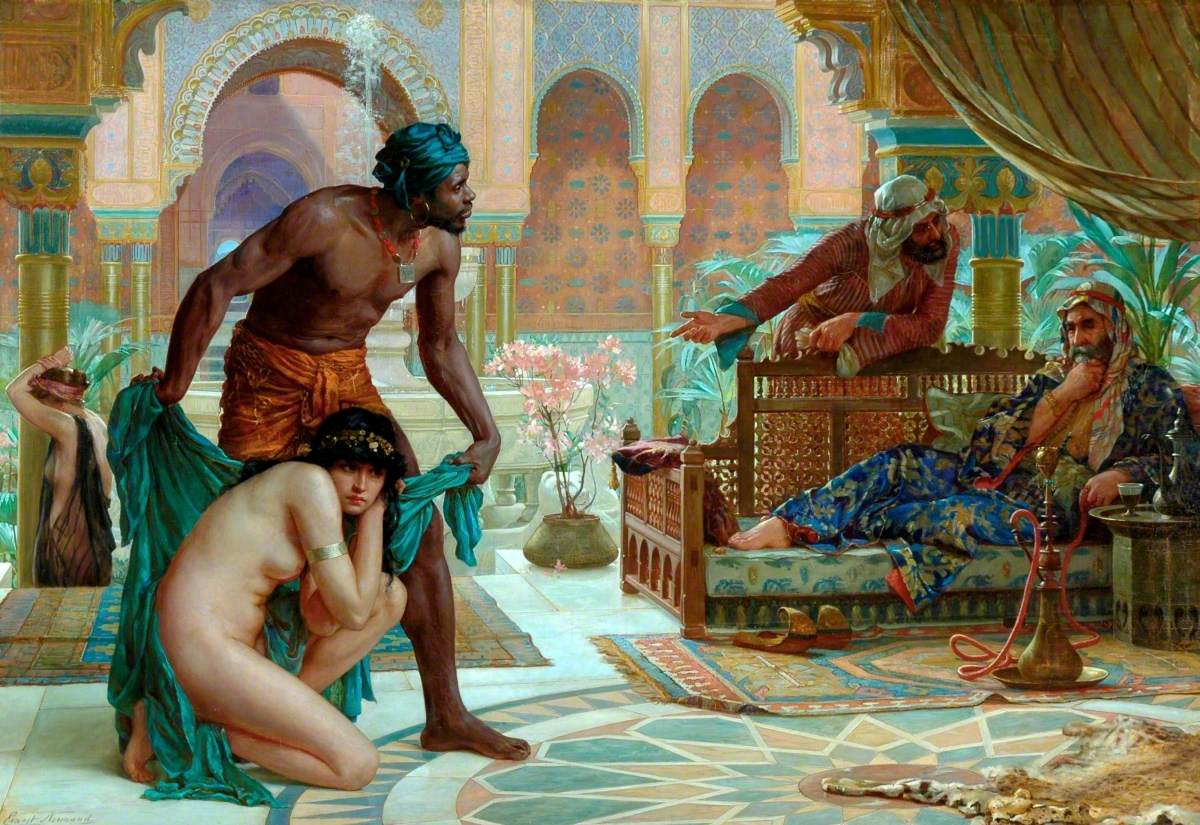
The Bitter Draught of Slavery, 1885

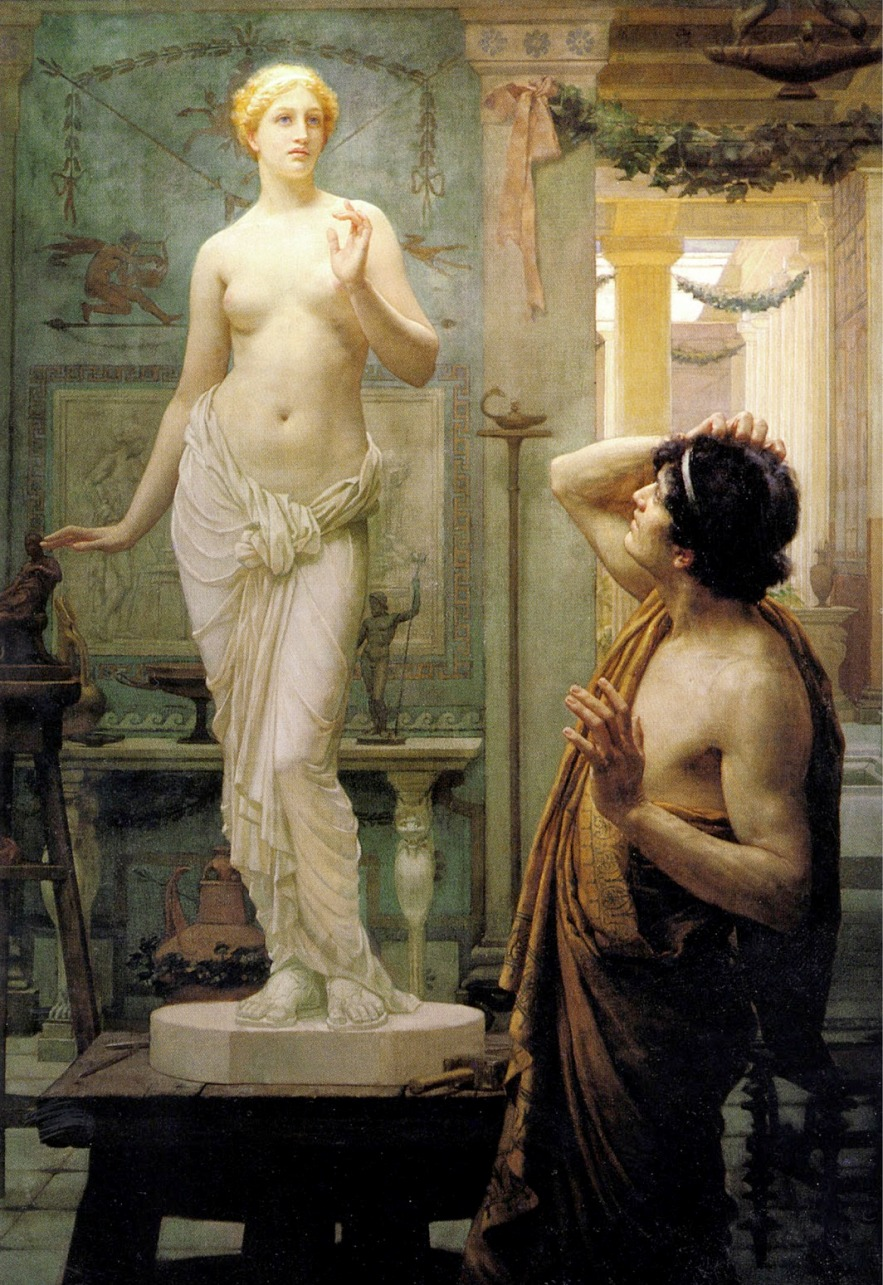
Pygmalion and Galatea, 1886

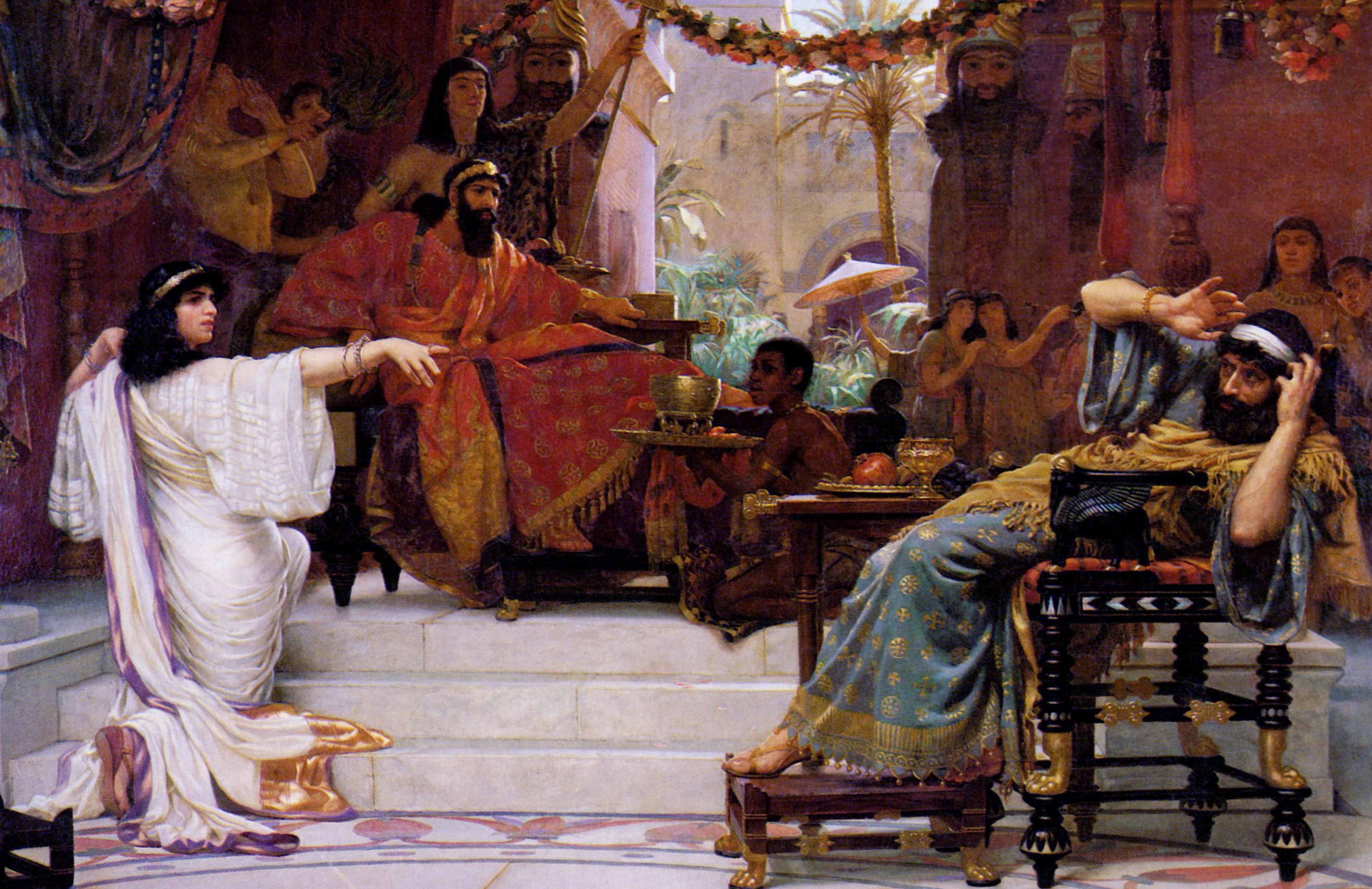
Esther Denouncing Haman, 1888

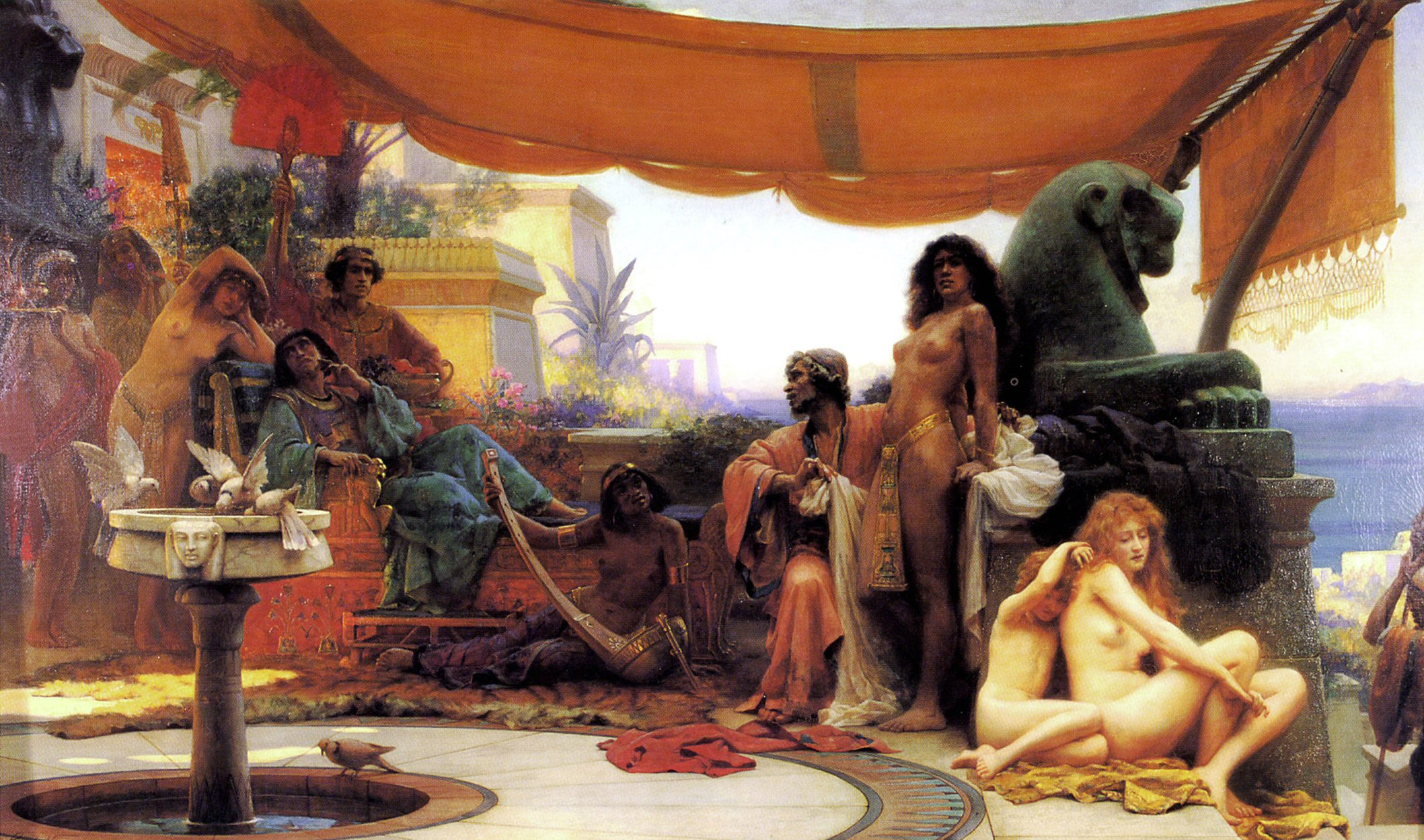
Bondage, 1890

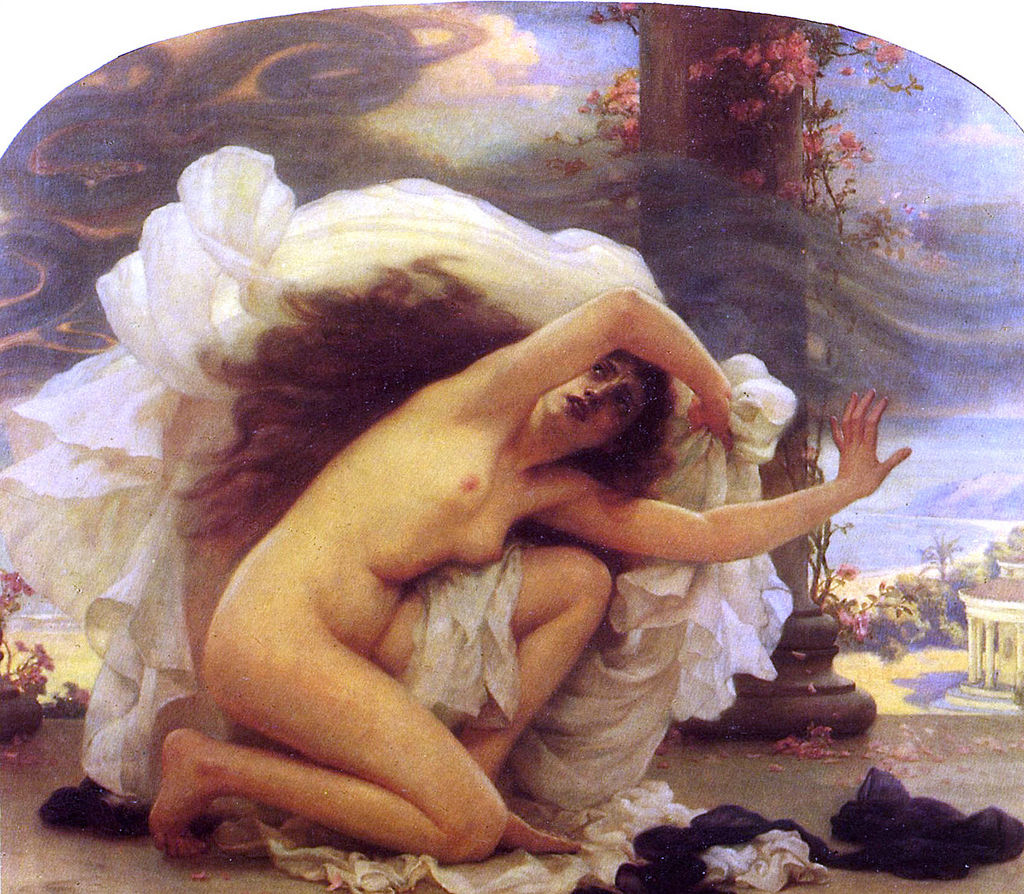
Pandora, 1899

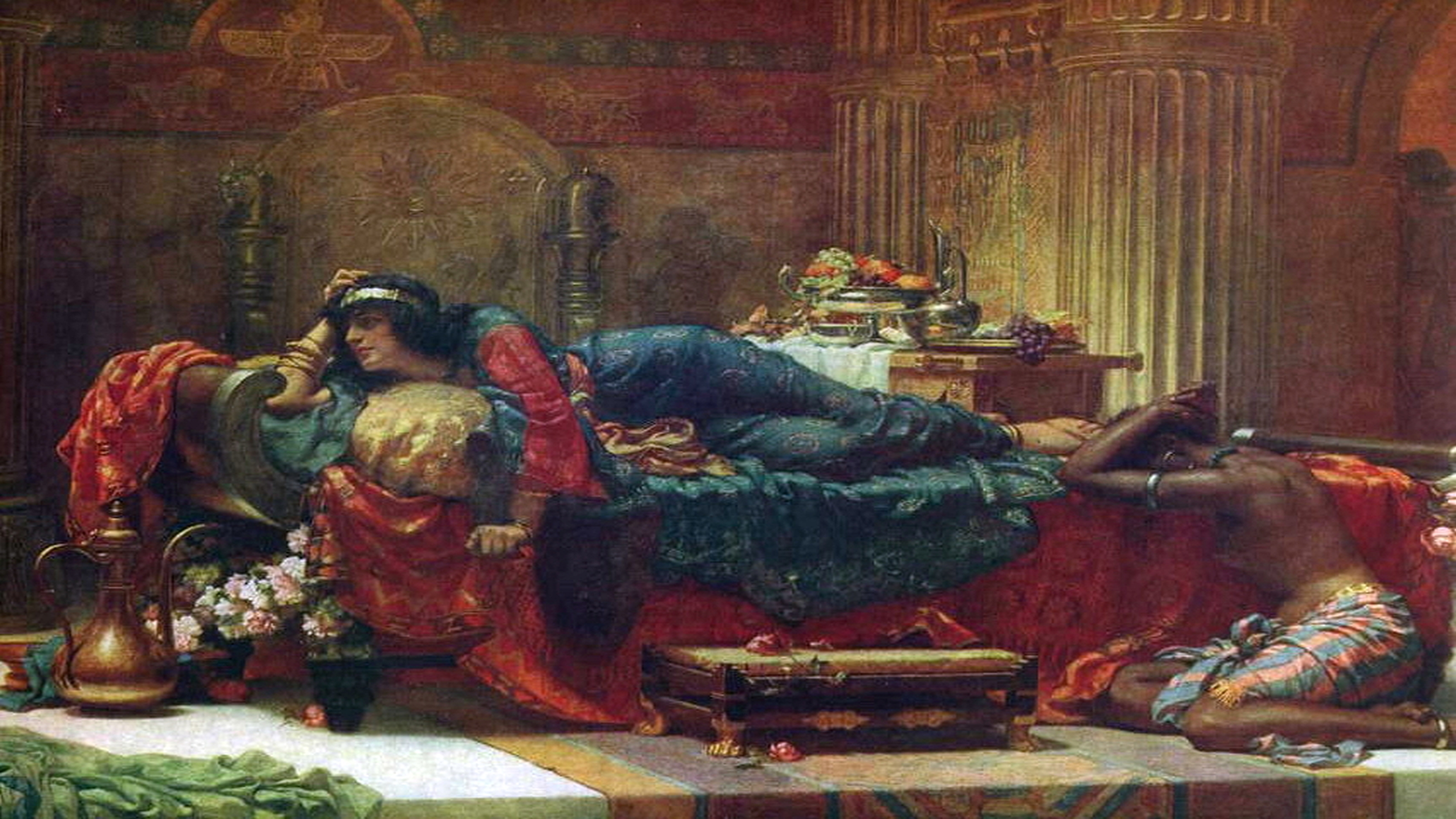
Queen Vashti Deposed, 1890

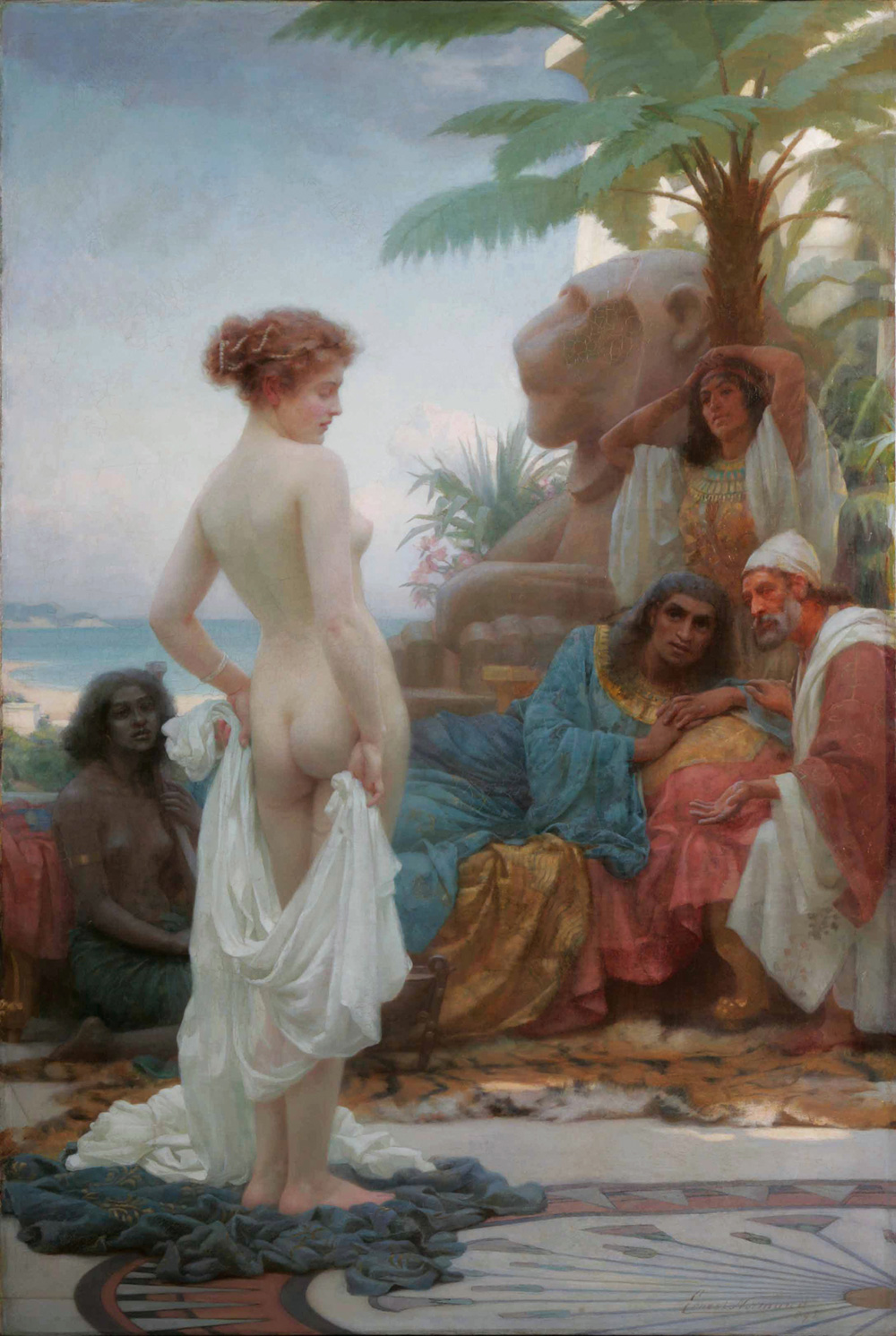
The White Slave, 1894

Select list of paintings and illustrations

- Pygmalion and Galatea, 1886
- Esther Denouncing Haman, 1888
- Death of Pharaoh's First Born, (illustration), 1905
- Queen Vashti Deposed, 1890
- The White Slave, 1894

== See also ==
- List of Orientalist artists
- Orientalism
