= Henrietta Rae =

English painter (1856–1928)

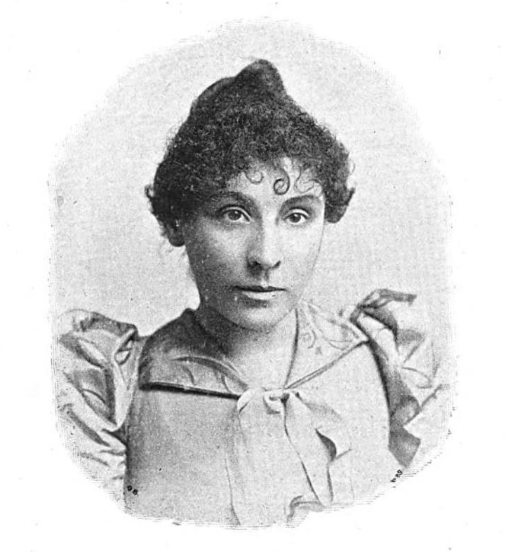
- Henrietta Rae before 1895
- Born: Henrietta Emma Ratcliffe Rae; 30 December 1856; Hammersmith, London, England
- Died: 26 January 1928 (aged 71); Upper Norwood, England
- Education: Academy Julien, Paris
- Known for: Painter, writer
- Notable work: The Lady with the Lamp
- Movement: Victorian art
- Spouse(s): Ernest Normand, painter (1857–1923)

Henrietta Emma Ratcliffe Rae (30 December 1856 – 26 January 1928) was a British painter of the late Victorian era, who specialised in classical, allegorical and literary subjects. Her best-known painting is The Lady with the Lamp (1891); depicting Florence Nightingale at Scutari.

== Biography ==
Henrietta Rae was born on 30 December 1856 in Hammersmith, London, to Thomas Burbey Rae, a civil servant, and Ann Eliza Rae (née Graves), a musician who had been a student of Felix Mendelssohn. She had three brothers and three sisters.

Rae began formally studying art at the age of thirteen, being educated at the Queen Square School of Art, Heatherley's School of Art (as the school's first female pupil) and at the British Museum. Rae reportedly applied to the Royal Academy of Arts at least five times before eventually gaining a seven-year scholarship. Her teachers there included Sir Lawrence Alma-Tadema, who had the strongest influence on her later work, as well as Frank Dicksee and William Powell Frith.

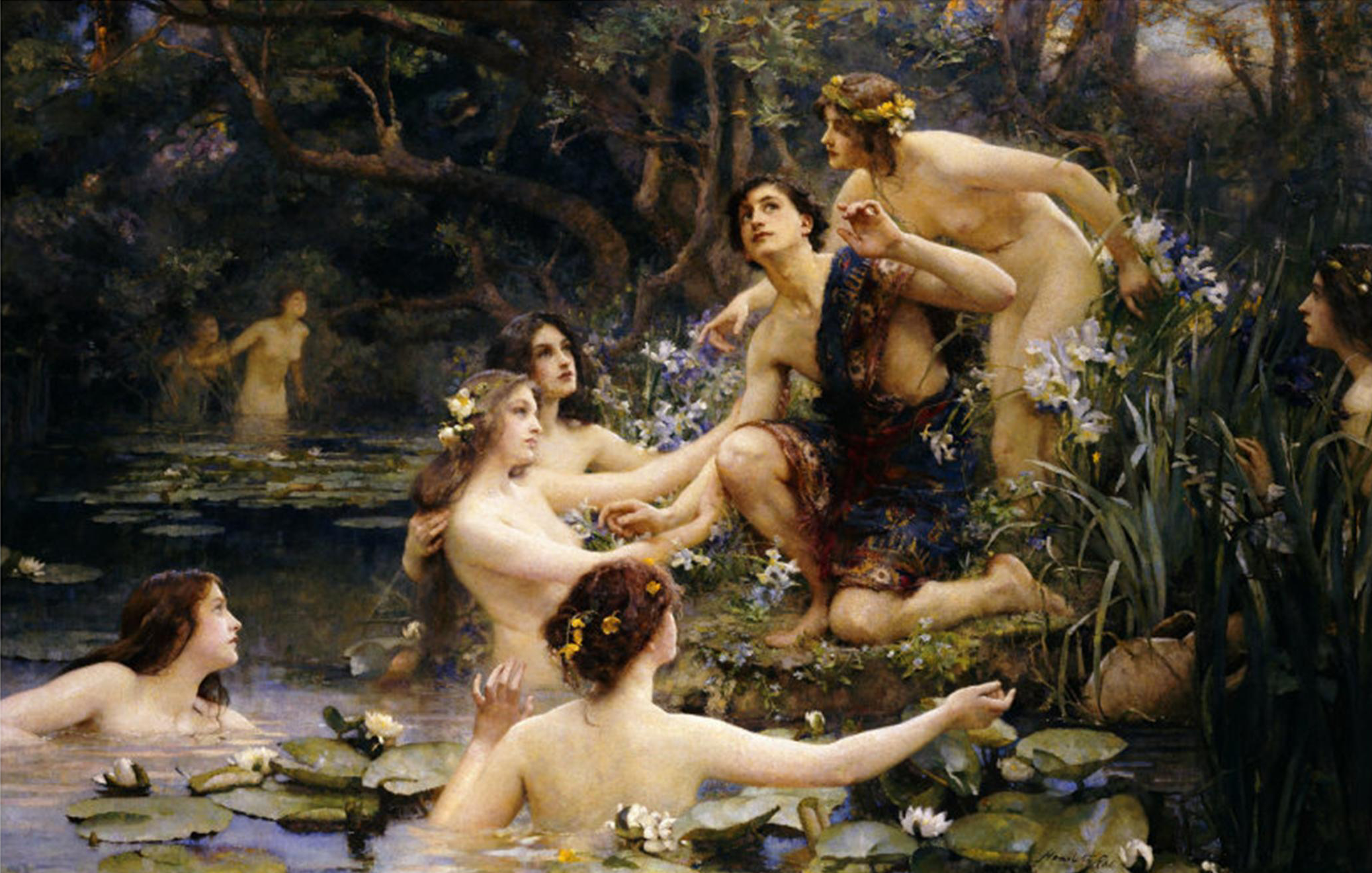
Hylas and the Water Nymphs, 1909, a representative example of her work

In 1884 she married painter and fellow Royal Academy student Ernest Normand, but kept her maiden name – a choice considered unusual at the time – because she had already begun to establish her reputation as an artist, having been a frequent exhibitor at the annual Royal Academy exhibitions since 1881. Rae and Normand lived in Holland Park, the residence of many other artists of the day. Frequent visitors included Leighton, Millais, Prinsep, and Watts. However, the attention was not always welcomed. In her memoirs, Rae described the overbearing attitudes and conduct of some of the more senior artists. In one such case, Prinsep dipped his thumb in cobalt blue paint and marked up one of Rae's pictures. In retaliation, Rae "accidentally" burnt his hat on her stove.

Rae and Normand travelled to Paris in 1890 to study at the Académie Julian with Jules Joseph Lefebvre and Jean-Joseph Benjamin-Constant. In 1893, they moved to Upper Norwood, into a studio that was custom-built for them by Normand's father. The couple had two children, a son (born in 1886) and a daughter (born in 1893).

Rae exhibited her work at the Palace of Fine Arts and The Woman's Building at the 1893 World's Columbian Exposition in Chicago, Illinois.

Rae was a supporter of feminism and women's suffrage. In 1897 Rae organised an exhibition of the work of female artists for the Jubilee of Queen Victoria.

She died on 26 January 1928 at Upper Norwood. Her cremated remains were buried in a small vault beneath one of two stelea outside the Normand mausoleum in Brookwood Cemetery, Surrey.

== Works ==
Rae specialised in classical, allegorical and literary subjects. Her painting Elaine Guarding the Shield of Lancelot (1885) drew inspiration from the Tennyson poem Lancelot and Elaine. Among her many other paintings in the classical vein, Eurydice Sinking Back to Hades (1886) won Honorable Mention at the 1889 International Exhibition in Paris and a medal at the 1893 World's Columbian Exposition in Chicago. Her 1891 painting Miss Nightingale at Scutari (1854), of Florence Nightingale, the founder of modern nursing, has been frequently reproduced, and is generally referred to as The Lady with the Lamp.

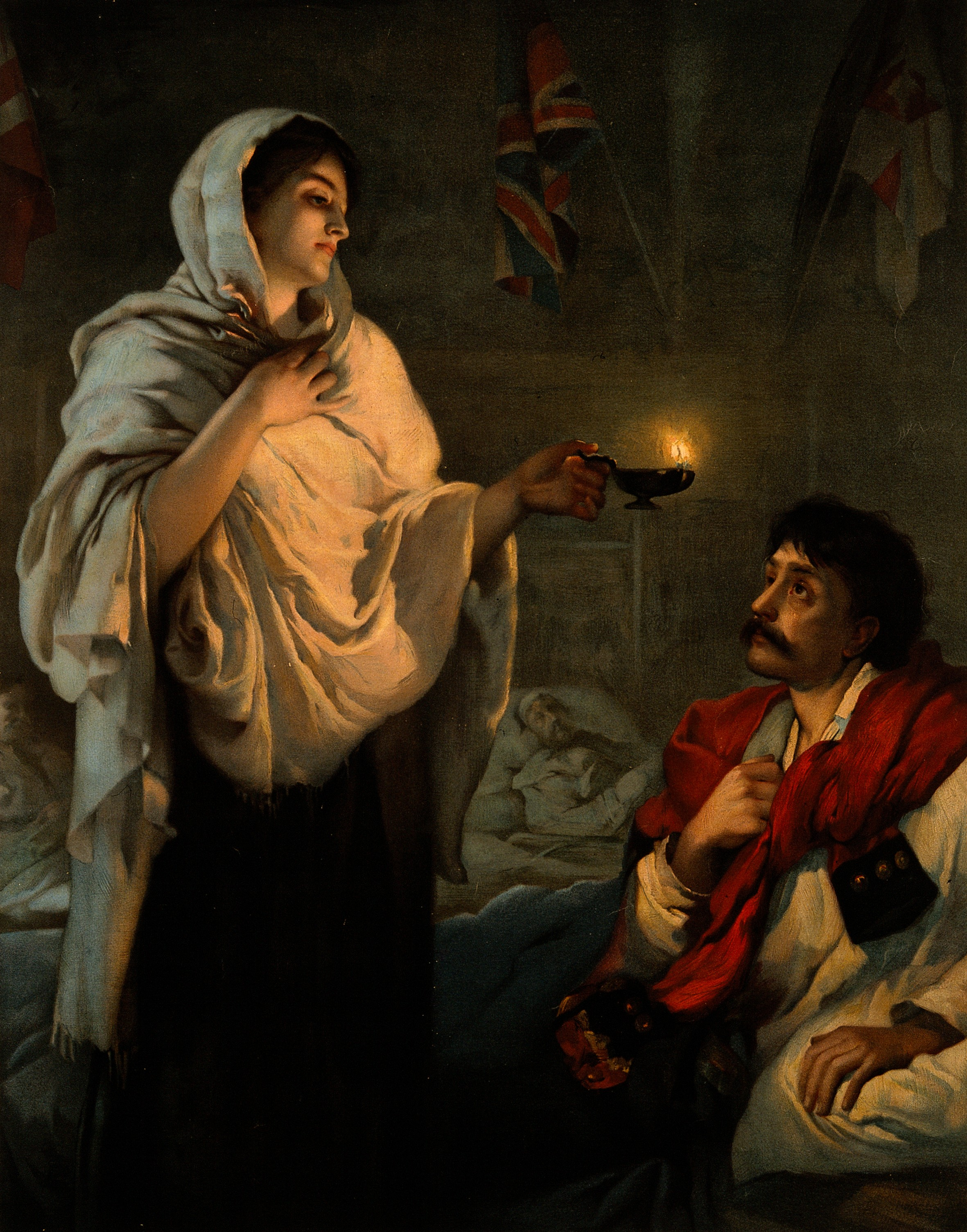
The Lady with the Lamp; a popular lithographic reproduction of her best-known painting

Rae's Psyche at the Throne of Venus (1894) measures 12 by 7 feet (370 by 210 cm) and contains 13 figures. Her painting Sir Richard Whittington Dispensing His Charities (1900) depicts Richard Whittington; a medieval merchant and four-time Lord Mayor of London. She also painted many socially prominent people; including Lord Dufferin in 1901.

Her works include:

- Love's young dream (1883)
- Elaine guarding the shield of Lancelot (1885)
- Ariadne (1885)
- Eurydice Sinking Back to Hades (1886)
- Zephyrus and Flora (1888)
- Miss Nightingale at Scutari (1854) (1891)
- Psyche at the throne of Venus (1894)
- Apollo and Daphne (1895)
- Diana and Calisto (1899)
- Sir Richard Whittington dispensing his Charities (1900) Mural at the Royal Exchange, London
- The Marquess of Dufferin and Ava (1901)
- Hylas and the water nymphs (1910)
- John Horner 1858-1919 (1913; Ulster Museum, Belfast)

=== Gallery ===
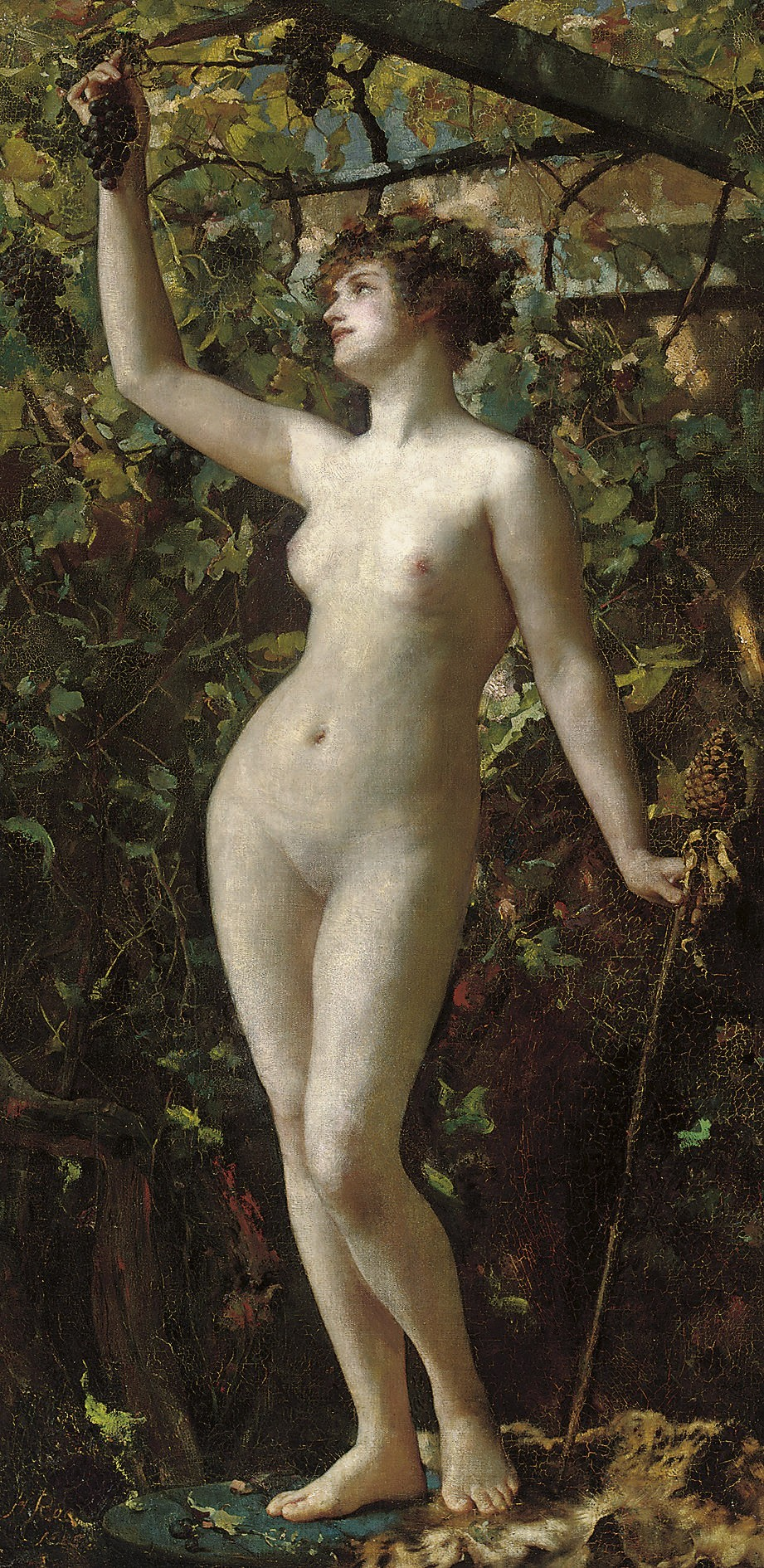
A Bacchante (1885)

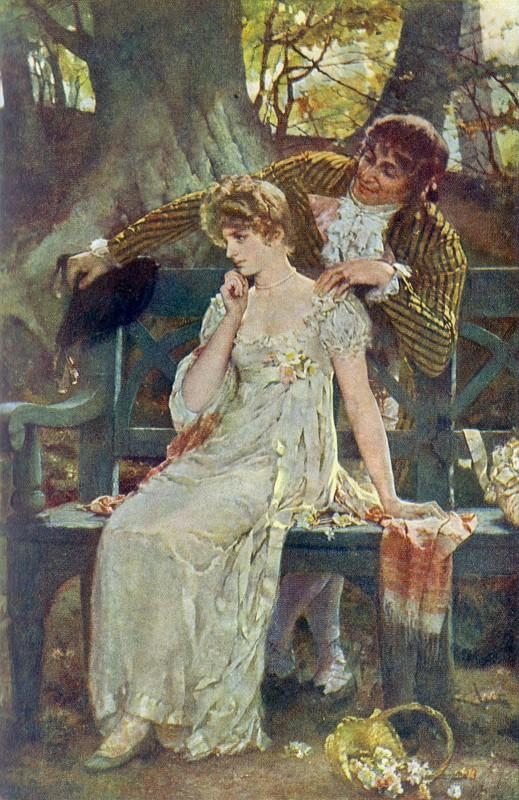
Doubts (1886)

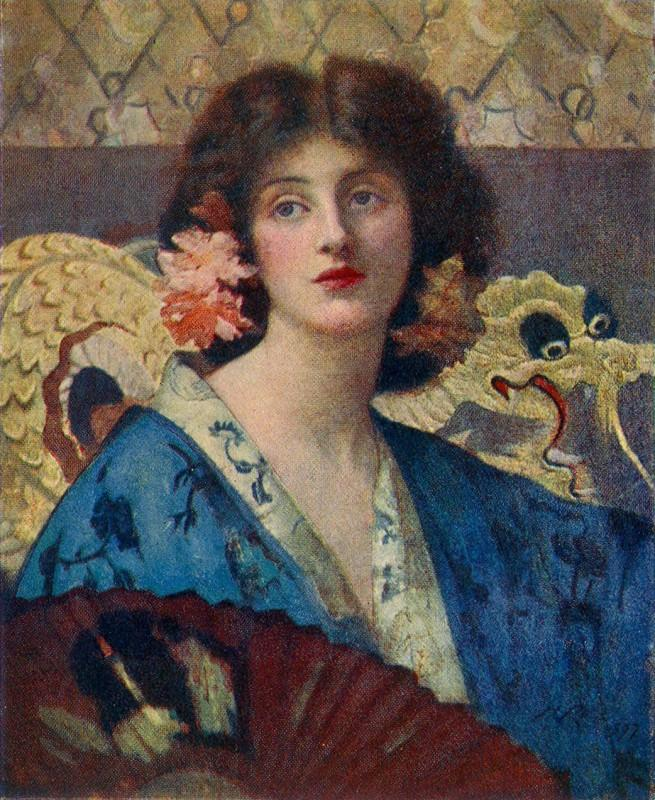
Azaleas (1895)

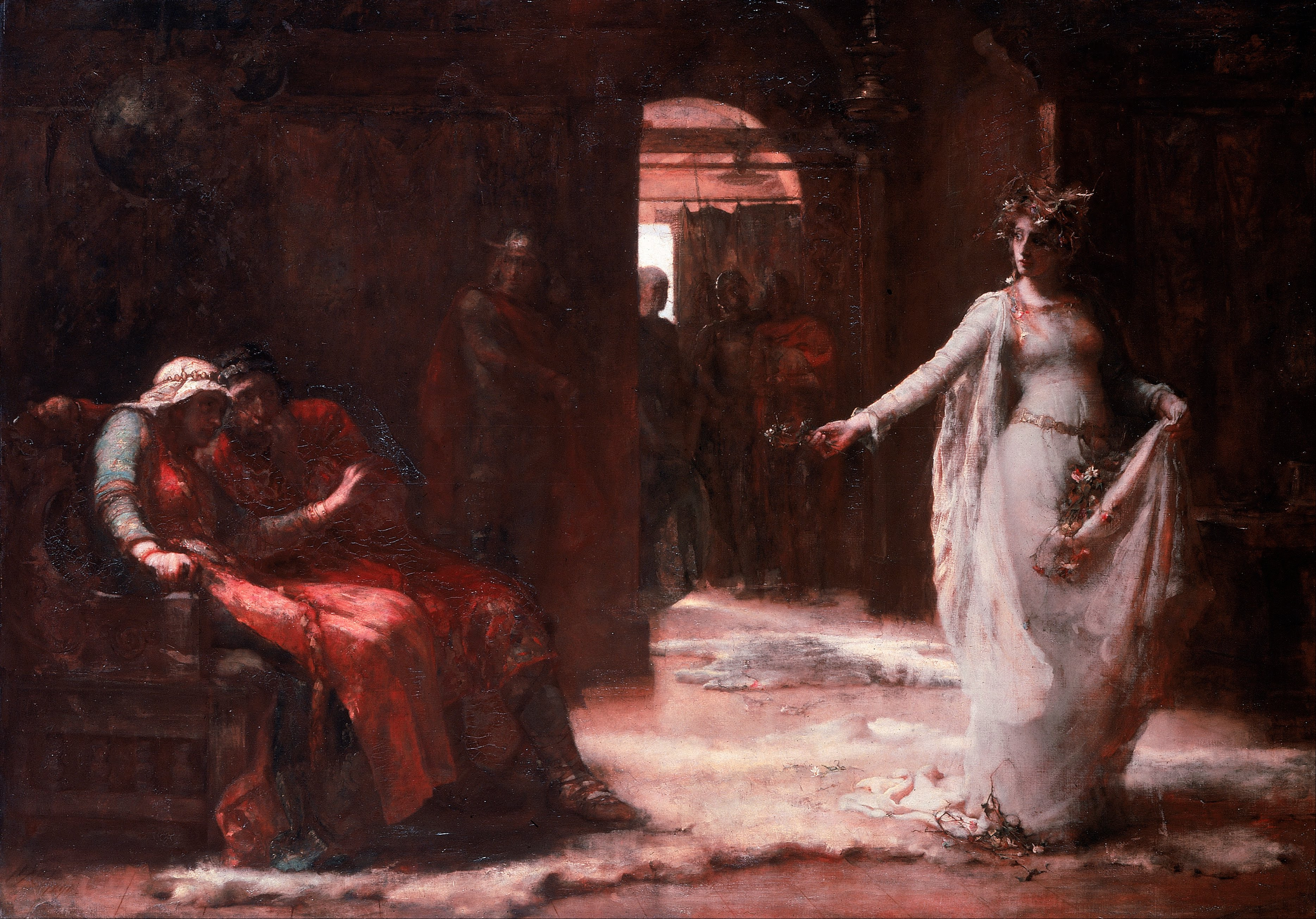
Ophelia (1890)

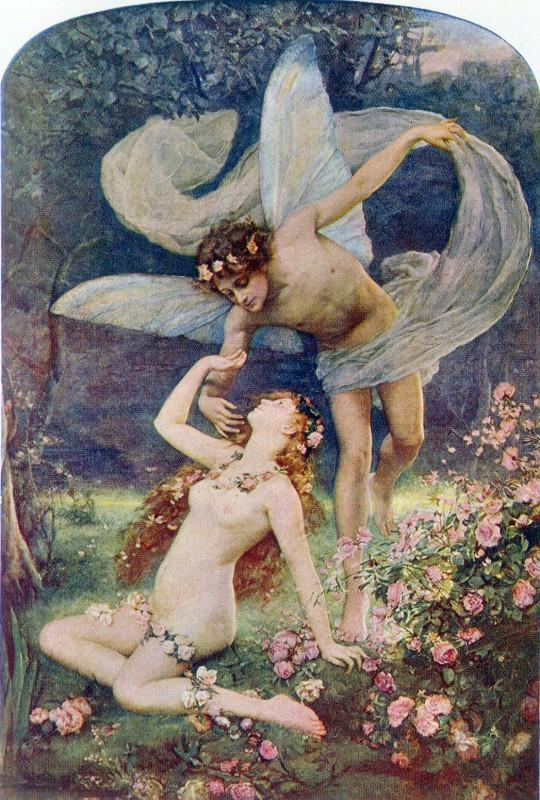
Zephyrus Wooing Flora (c. 1900)

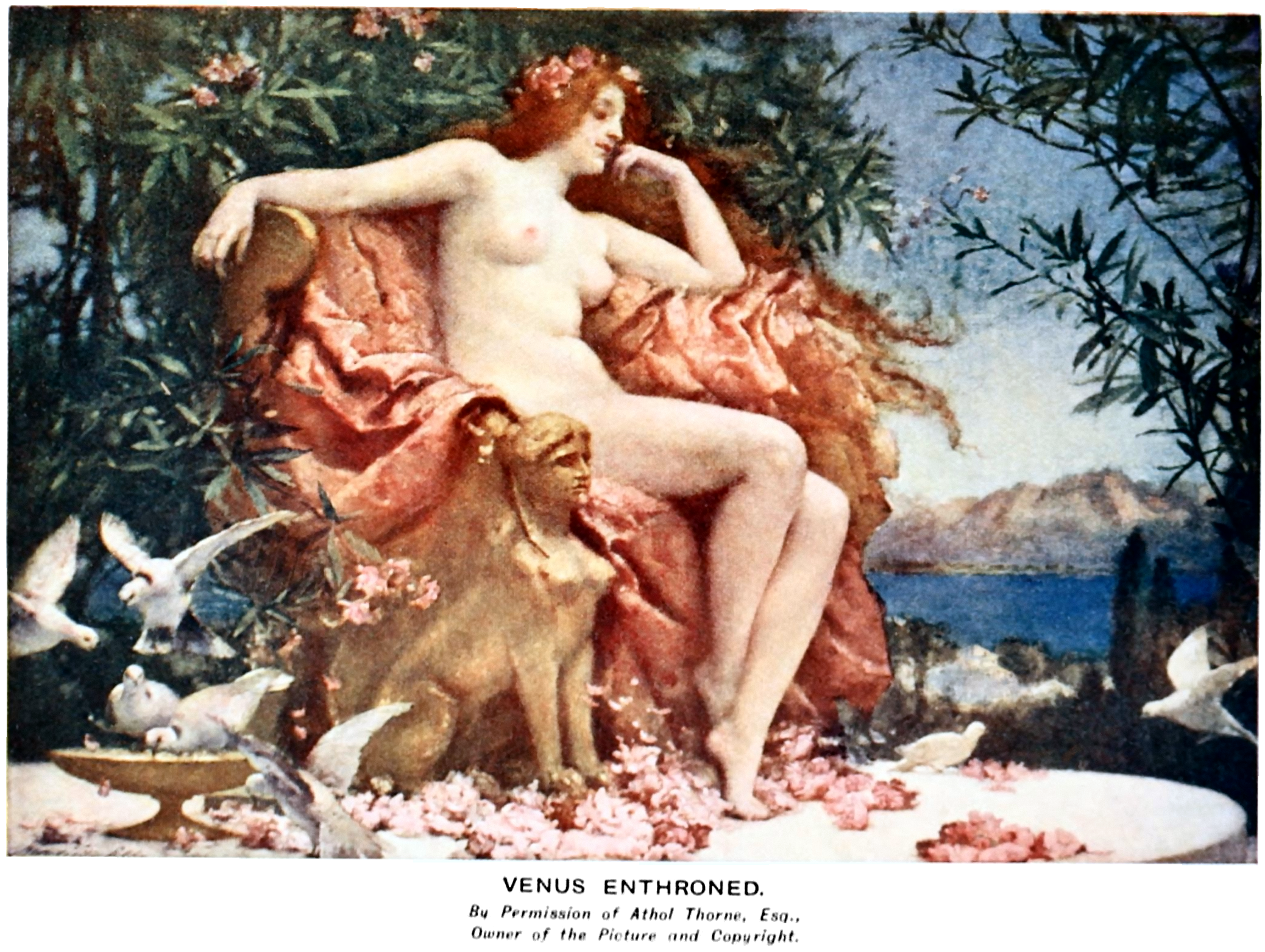
Venus Enthroned (1902)

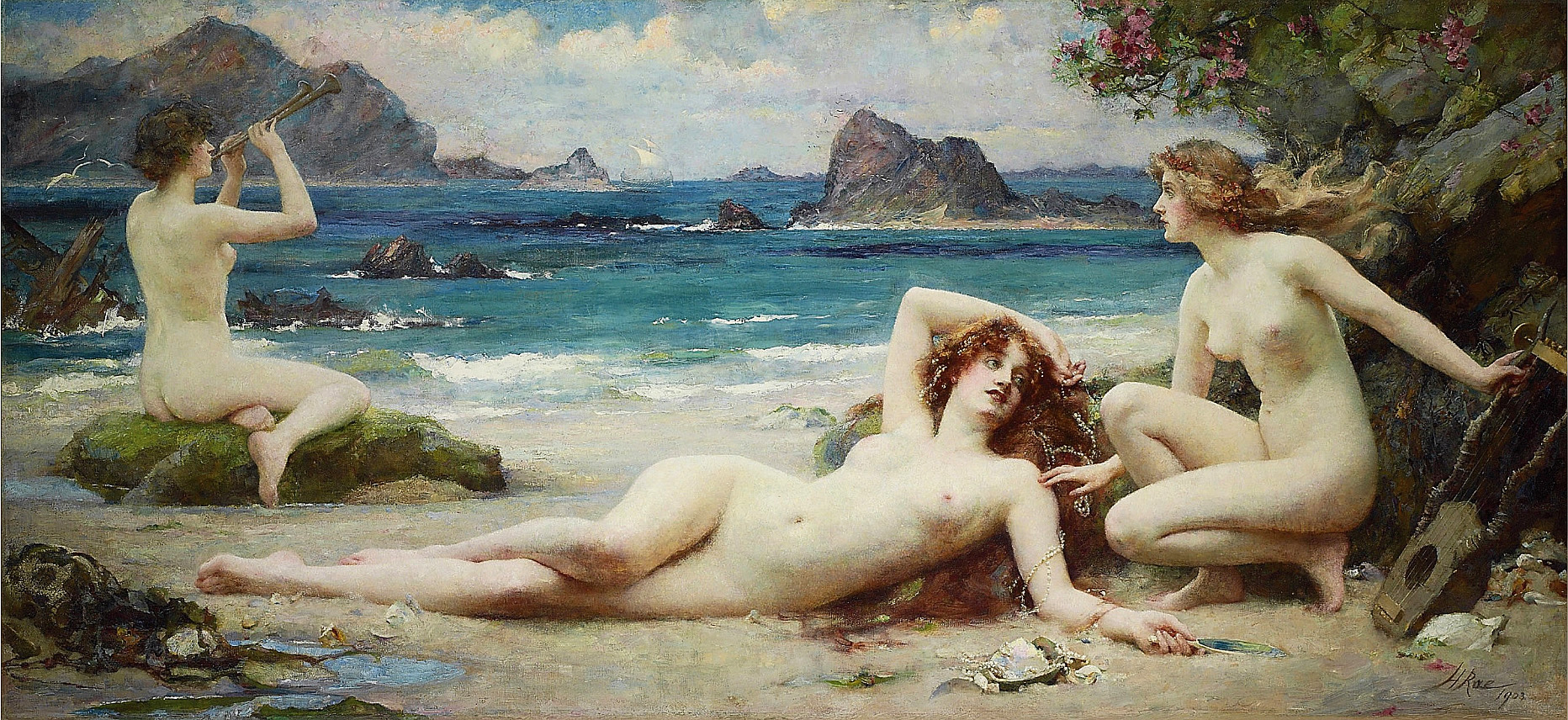
The Sirens (1903)

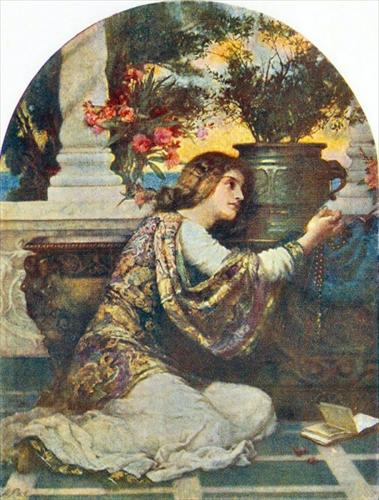
Isabella (1905)
