= Handmaiden =

Female personal servant

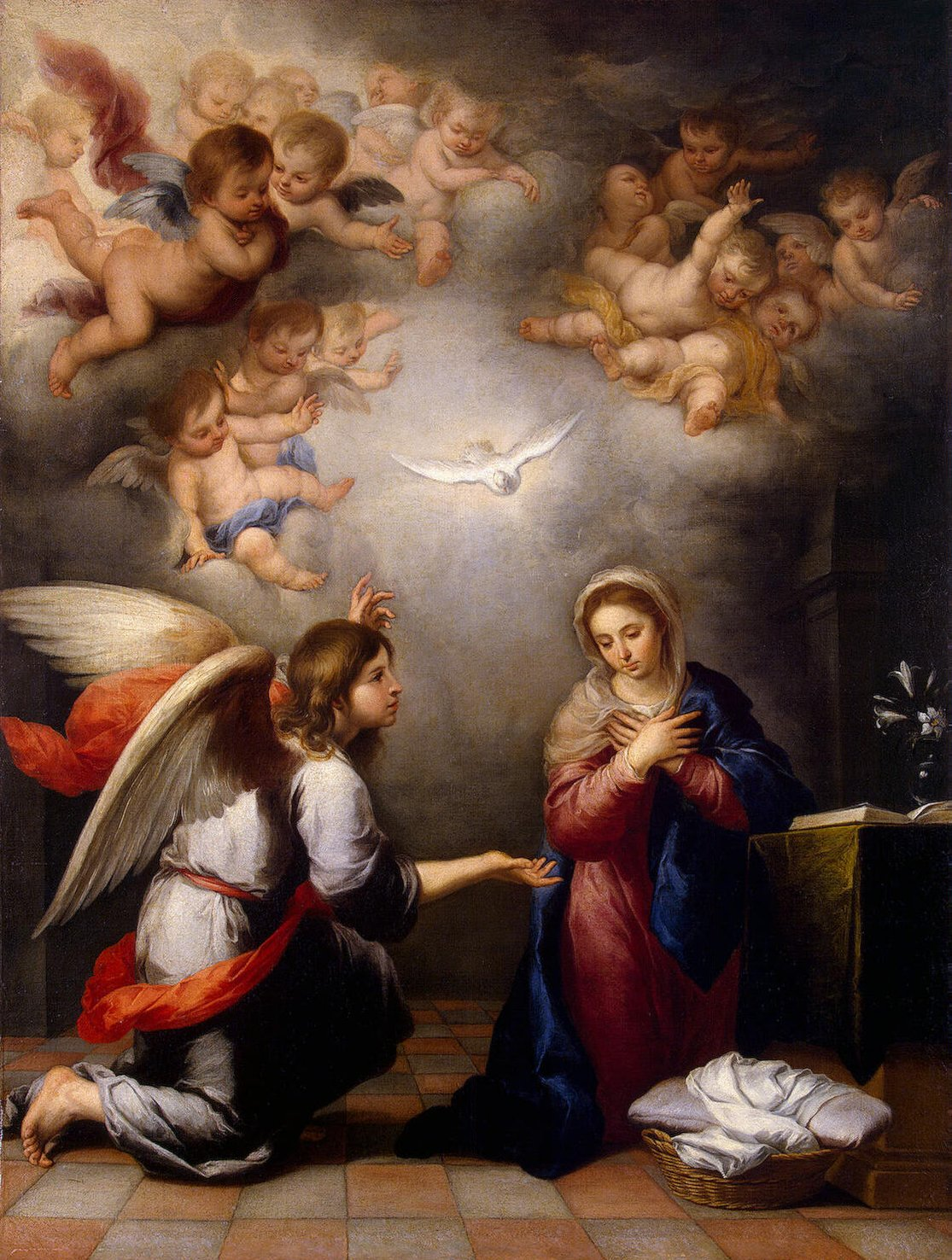
The Annunciation by Murillo, 1655–1660, Hermitage Museum, Saint Petersburg

A handmaiden (nowadays less commonly handmaid or maidservant) is a personal maid or female servant. The term is also used metaphorically for something whose primary role is to serve or assist. Depending on culture or historical period, a handmaiden may be of enslaved status or may be simply an employee. The terms handmaiden and handmaid are synonyms.

== Depictions in Abrahamic texts ==
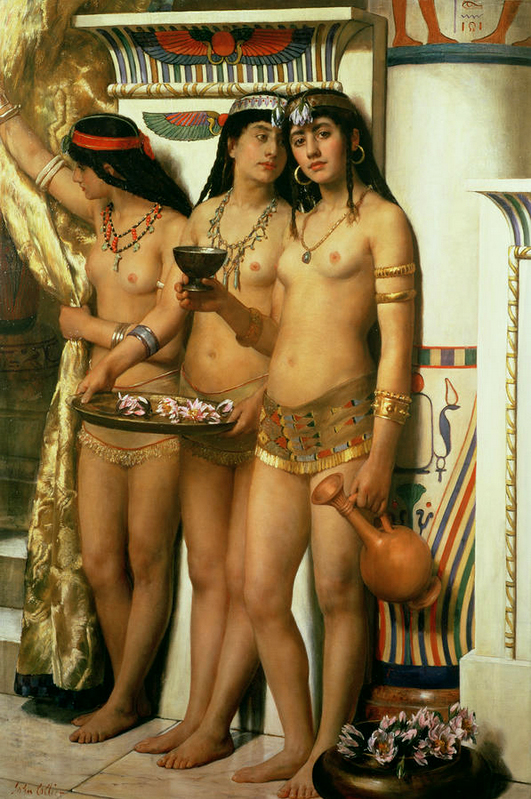
The Pharaoh's Handmaidens by John Collier, 1883

In the King James translation of the Hebrew Bible, the term handmaid is applied to a female servant who serves her mistress, as in the case of Hagar being described as Sarah's handmaid, Zilpah being Leah's handmaid and Bilhah as Rachel's handmaid. In each of these cases, the mistress "gave" their handmaid to their husbands "to wife", to bear his "seed" (children). The use in the Torah of the prefix "to", as in "gave to wife", may indicate that the wife is a concubine or inferior wife. The text repeats that these people remain handmaids of their mistress though they are also the concubine of the mistress's husband. They are referred to interchangeably by the Hebrew terms אָמָה (’āmāh) and שִׁפְחָה (šip̄ḥāh). Other modern English bible translations use the word slave, slave-girl or servant.

== Mary ==
In Christianity, Mary, the mother of Jesus is referred to as the "handmaid of the Lord" or "servant of the Lord", both of which are titles of honour for the mother of Jesus. The Gospel of Luke describes Mary as the "handmaid of the Lord" (Greek δούλη, doulē) when she gives her consent to the message of the Angel (see Luke 1:38), and when she proclaims the greatness of the Lord because of "the great things" he has worked in her (see Luke 1:49)."

== In popular culture ==
- The Handmaid's Tale, а dystopian novel by Canadian author Margaret Atwood.
  - The Handmaid's Tale (1990 film adaptation of the novel)
  - The Handmaid's Tale (2000 operatic adaptation of the novel)
  - The Handmaid's Tale (2017 TV adaptation of the novel)
- The Handmaiden, a 2016 South Korean film directed by Park Chan-wook.
- In the book series A Song of Ice and Fire by George R.R. Martin, which falls into the genres of both epic fantasy and dark fantasy, the female servants of a queen or a lady are referred to as "handmaidens" and the term is used to refer to many characters, most notably Queen Margaery Tyrell's cousins, Elinor Tyrell and Megga Tyrell, who serve as Margaery's handmaidens upon her arrival in King's Landing.
- In the sci-fi Star Wars franchise, the term refers to the female assistants of a reigning queen, most notably the Royal Naboo Handmaidens on the planet Naboo.
- In Rapunzel’s Tangled Adventure, the penultimate episode is "Once a Handmaiden..."

== See also ==
- Domestic worker
- Henchman
- Lady's maid
- Lady-in-waiting
- Nurse stereotypes
