= Circe (painting) =

Painting by John Collier

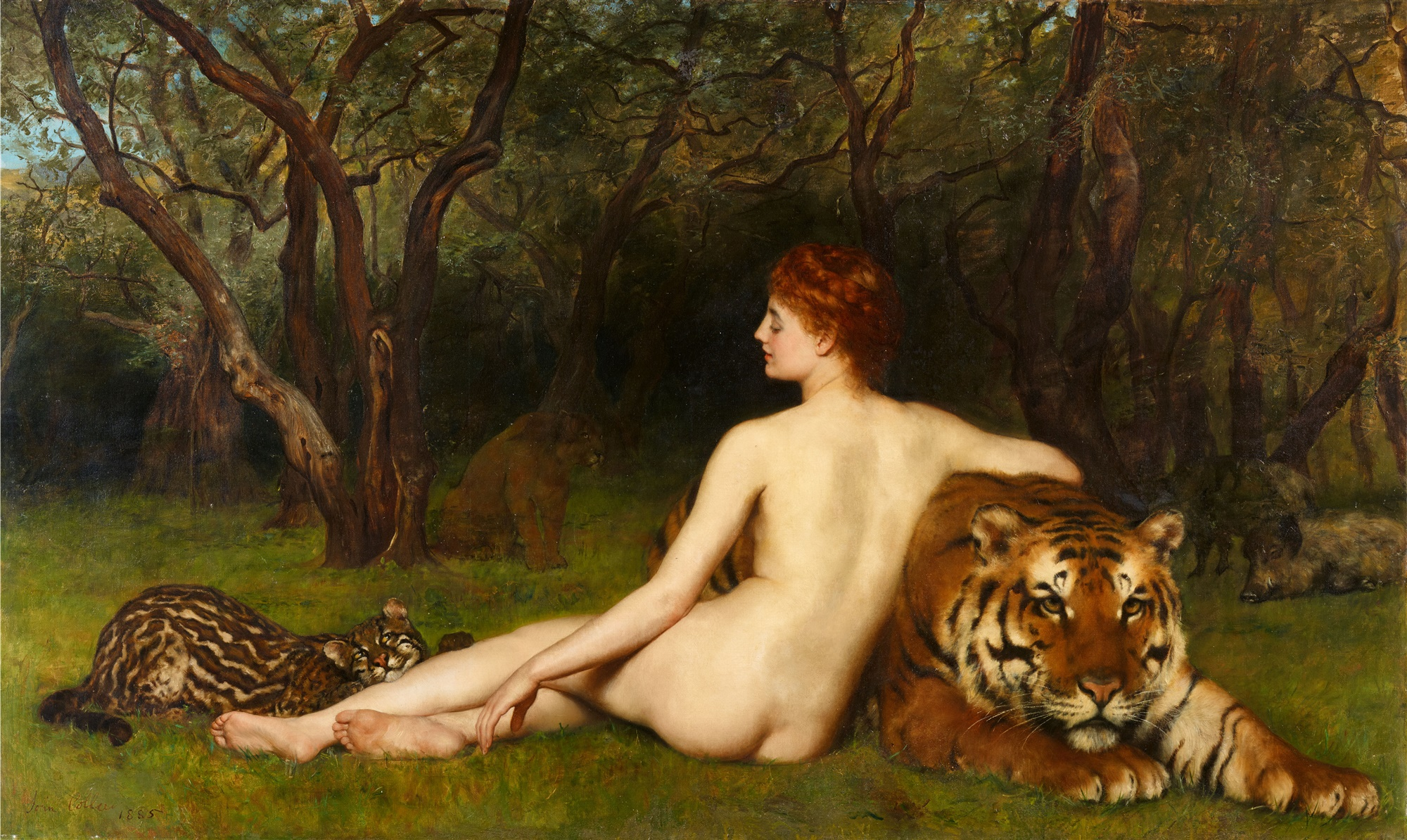
- Artist: John Collier
- Year: 1885
- Medium: Oil on canvas, history painting
- Dimensions: 133 cm × 219 cm (52 in × 86 in)
- Location: Private collection

Circe is an oil on canvas history painting by the British artist John Collier, from 1885. It is held in a private collection.

== Description ==
The work features the mythical figure of Circe, shown nude from behind, calmly poised with a tiger and another large cat, an ocelot, on either side. On the background is shown a forest, with a puma, at the left, and two boars, one of them resting, at the right. Circe was a seductive enchantress who featured in Homer's epic poem The Odyssey. Collier was strongly influenced by the Pre-Raphaelite movement, although the painting reflects the style of academic art of the decade. It was displayed at the Royal Academy's Summer Exhibition of 1885 held at Burlington House in London, where it was hailed as a "remarkable success" in one review. It was later exhibited at the World's Columbian Exposition in Chicago in 1893.

== Bibliography ==
- Cox, Devon. The Street of Wonderful Possibilities: Whistler, Wilde and Sargent in Tite Street. Aurum, 2022.
- Smith, Elise Lawton. Evelyn Pickering De Morgan and the Allegorical Body. Fairleigh Dickinson Univ Press, 2002.
- Smith, Alison. The Victorian Nude: Sexuality, Morality, and Art. Manchester University Press, 1996.
