= The Pharaoh's Handmaidens =

Painting by John Collier

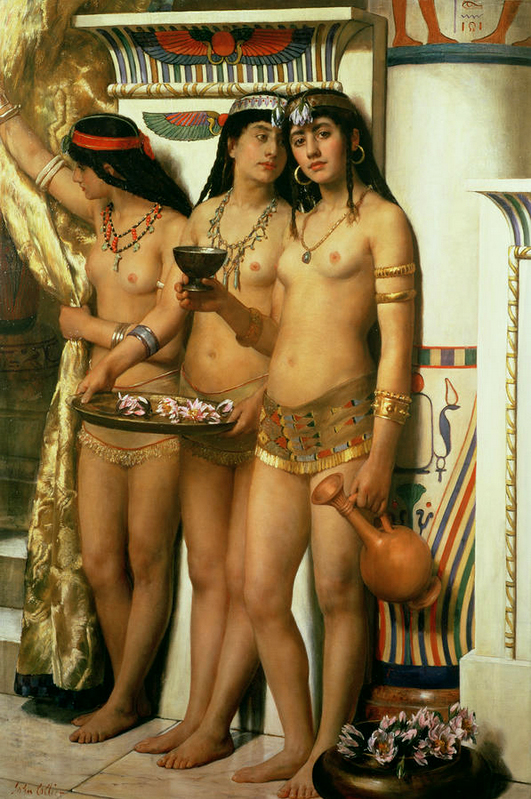
- Artist: John Collier
- Year: 1883
- Medium: Oil on canvas, history painting
- Dimensions: 128 cm × 66 cm (50 in × 26 in)
- Location: Private collection

The Pharaoh's Handmaidens is an 1883 oil painting by the British artist John Collier. It features three handmaidens of an Ancient Egyptian pharaoh standing together. It combines elements of nude art and orientalism, common in academic art of the period. It was displayed at the exhibition of the Grosvenor Gallery in London, a rival of the Royal Academy's Summer Exhibition. A review in The Architect magazine suggested that while it "may be ethnographically correct" that "the picture as a whole cannot be considered either agreeable or refined".

== Bibliography ==
- Cohen, Michael. Sisters: Relation and Rescue in Nineteenth-century British Novels and Paintings. Fairleigh Dickinson Univ Press, 1995.
- Moser, Stephanie. Painting Antiquity: Ancient Egypt in the Art of Lawrence Alma-Tadema, Edward Poynter and Edwin Long. Oxford University Press, 2020.
