= Eve (Collier) =

Painting by John Collier

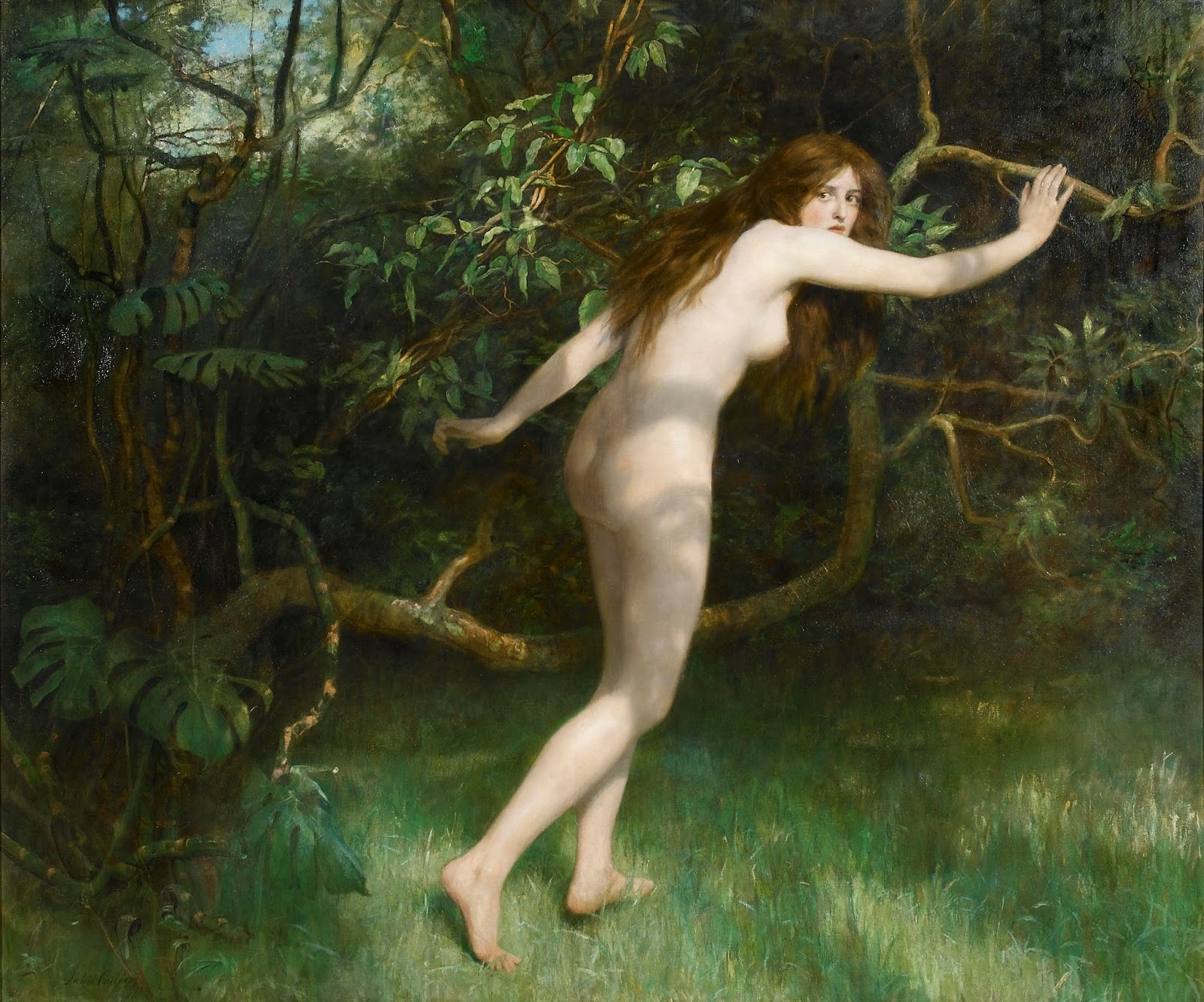
- Artist: John Collier
- Year: 1911
- Medium: Oil on canvas, history painting
- Dimensions: 160 cm × 190 cm (63 in × 75 in)
- Location: Private collection

Eve is an oil painting on canvas by the British artist John Collier, from 1911. Combining nude and religious art, it depicts the biblical figure of Eve. She is depicted alone in the Garden of Eden, with a guilty expression. The painting was displayed at the Royal Academy's Summer Exhibition of 1911 at Burlington House in London.

== Bibliography ==
- Pollock, Walter Herries. The Art of the Hon. John Collier. Virtue & Company, 1914.
- Richardson, Betty. John Collier. Twayne, 1983.
