= A Glass of Wine with Caesar Borgia =

Painting by John Collier

- Artist: John Collier
- Year: 1893
- Type: Oil on canvas, history painting
- Dimensions: 140 cm × 240 cm (55 in × 94 in)
- Location: Ipswich Museum, Suffolk

A Glass of Wine with Caesar Borgia is a history painting of 1893 by the British history painter John Collier. It depicts a scene featuring members of the House of Borgia around 1500, during Renaissance Italy. Cesare Borgia is shown offering a glass of wine to a man, perhaps hinted to contain poison, while seated next to his father Pope Alexander VI with a watchful Lucrezia Borgia, his sister, just behind him.

The painting was shown in the Royal Academy Exhibition of 1893 held at Burlington House in London. Today it is in the collection of Ipswich Museum having been acquired as part of the Felix Cobbold Bequest.

== Bibliography ==
- Clive, Mary. The Day of Reckoning. Macmillan, 1964.
- Pollock, Walter Herries. The Art of John Collier. Virtue & Company, 1914.
- Reitlinger, Gerald. The Rise and Fall of the Picture Market, 1760-1960. Holt, Rinehart and Winston, 1964.
