= Clytemnestra (Collier) =

Painting by John Collier

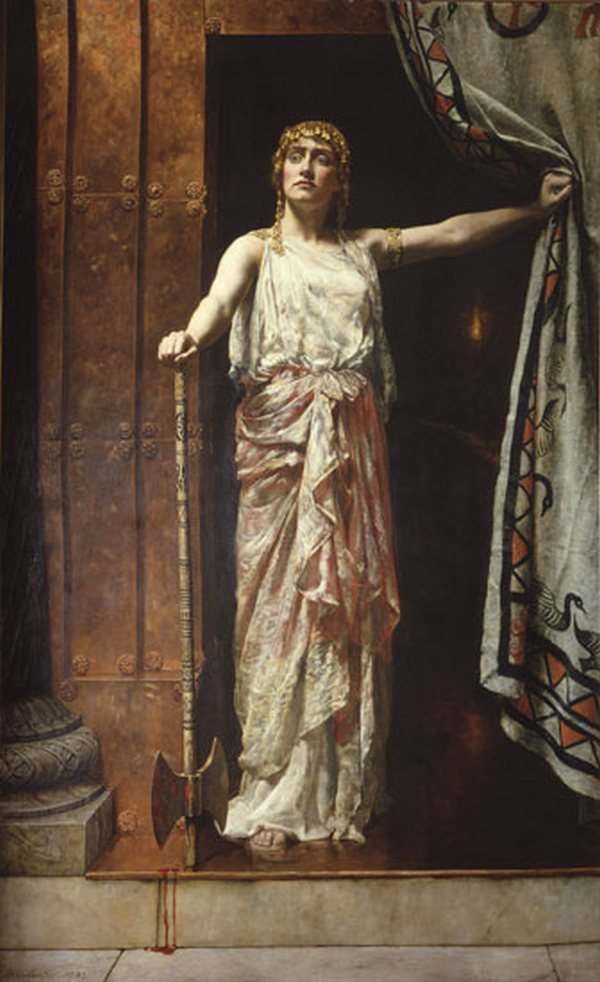
- Artist: John Collier
- Year: 1882
- Medium: Oil on canvas
- Dimensions: 239 cm × 174 cm (94 in × 69 in)
- Location: Guildhall Art Gallery, City of London

Clytemnestra, also known as Clytemnestra after the Murder, is an 1882 oil painting by the English artist John Collier. It has been in the Guildhall Art Gallery, in the City of London, since 1893. A second version, c. 1914, is in the Worcester City Art Gallery & Museum.

== Description and analysis ==
The painting in London measures 239 cm × 174 cm (94 in × 69 in). It depicts Clytemnestra, mythical daughter of the Spartan Leda and sister of Helen of Troy, who herself became queen of ancient Mycenae. In an episode recounted in the tragic play Agamemnon by Aeschylus, the stern-faced queen is shown at the palace of Argos, shortly after she has killed her husband Agamemnon in revenge for his sacrifice of their oldest daughter Iphigenia to secure favourable winds for the journey to the siege of Troy. Agamemnon returned home with the captured Trojan princess Cassandra, but an enraged Clytemnestra murdered them both (in some accounts she is assisted by their son Orestes, and in others Agamemnon is killed by her lover Aegisthus).

Clytemnestra is standing in a doorway, holding back a curtain with one hand, and resting her other hand on the very long handle of a double-headed axe, which is dripping blood onto the floor. Her clothes are also spattered with blood, while a body can be dimly seen in the gloomy room beyond.

Collier was influenced by Lawrence Alma-Tadema, who encouraged Collier to use archaeological discoveries to give his paintings greater historical accuracy. Details of the painting are based on discoveries from excavations of archaeological sites in Greece and of the site of Troy in Turkey. Clytemnestra is wearing a delicate gold headpiece, based on the small "Helen of Troy" diadem, part of the so-called Treasure of Priam discovered by Heinrich Schliemann in the 1870s. The pattern traced on the axehead is taken from a stone cylinder also from Troy. Her patterned clothes and the architecture of the doorway are based on other archaeological examples, and the column beside the doorway in the painting resembles one from the Treasury of Atreus at Mycenae (but with its capital incorrectly positioned at the base of the column rather than its top, perhaps based on a similarly inverted contemporaneous display of the column at the British Museum, later corrected). The somewhat androgynous features of Clytemnestra may be based on a production of the Aeschylus play Agamemnon at Balliol College, Oxford in 1880, in which a male student Frank Benson acted the part of Clytemnestra.

The painting was exhibited at the Royal Academy's Summer Exhibition of 1882, accompanied by a line from Aeschylus's play: "Him twice I smote – twice groaning prone he fell, / With limbs relaxed; then, prostrate where he lay, / Him with third blow I dowered, votive gift / To Hades, guardian of the dead below." It was presented to the Guildhall Art Gallery in 1893 by Mrs Mary Harrison.

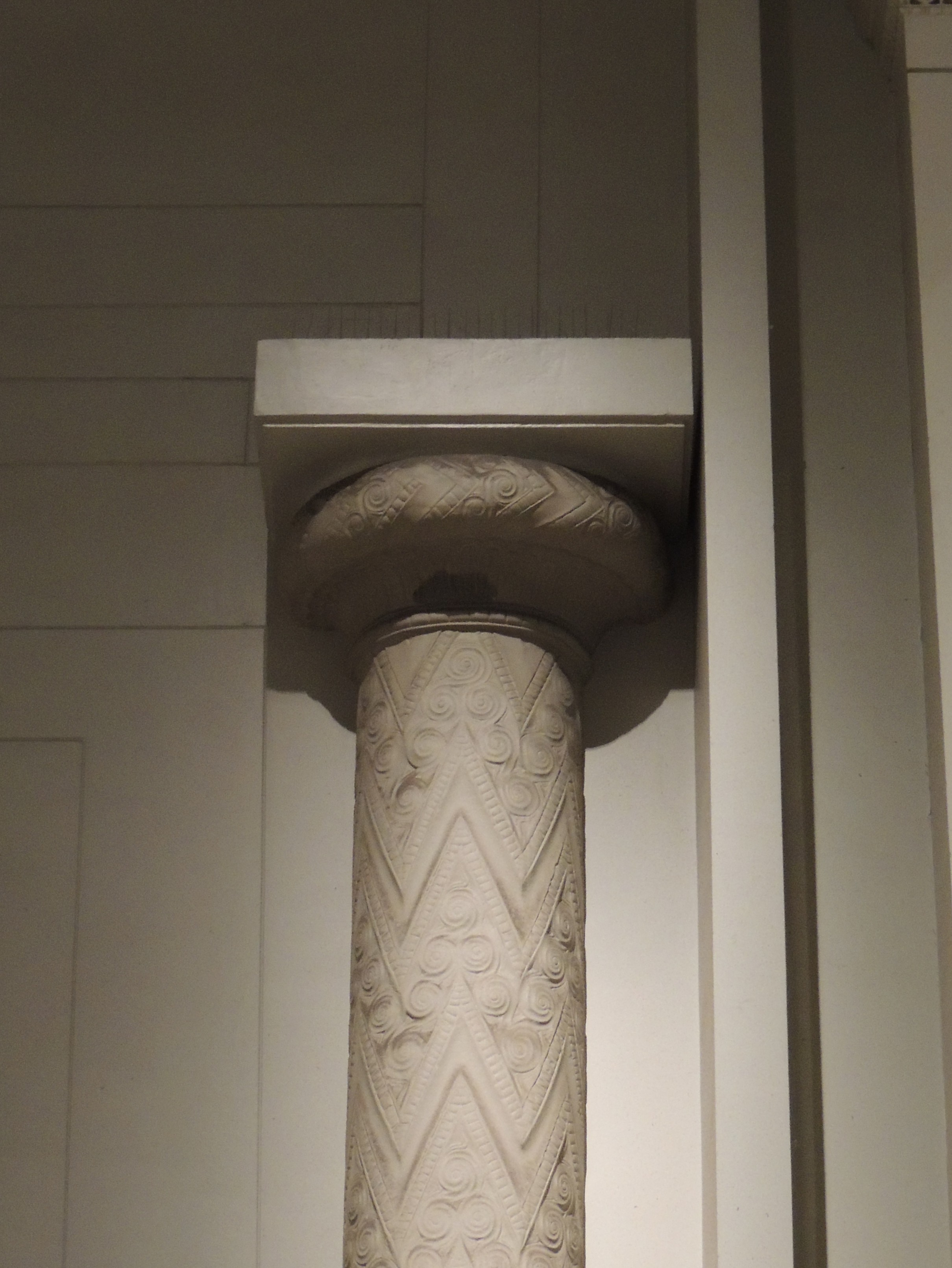
Reconstruction of a column from the Treasury of Atreus, at the British Museum

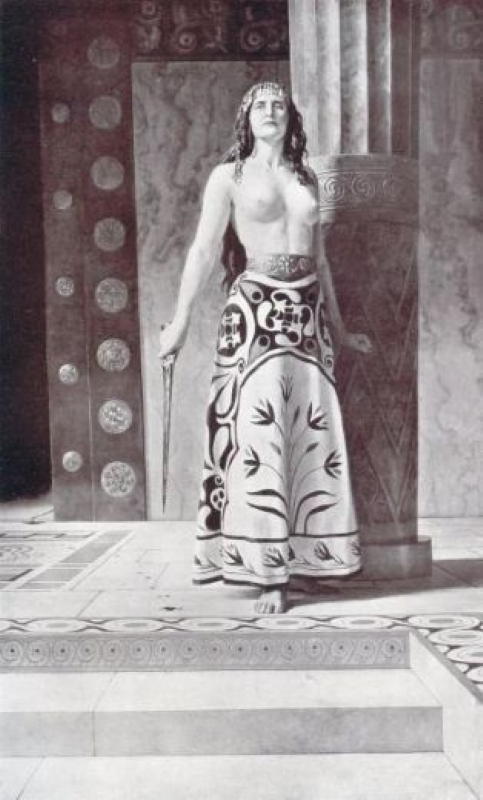
Version in Worcester City Art Gallery & Museum, c.1914

== Second version ==
Around 1914, Collier painted a second version of the scene, correcting many of the details of the Mycenaean period. The second painting depicts a bare-breasted Clytemnestra with a bloody Mycenaean sword. Many details are different, including the decoration of the floor, and doorway. Clytemnestra wears a long skirt based on Minoan discoveries, replacing the robe in the 1882 version, and the column from the Treasury of Atreus has been put up the right way. It measures 238 cm × 147.8 cm (93.7 in × 58.2 in), and is held by Worcester City Art Gallery & Museum.
