= The Last Voyage of Henry Hudson =

Painting by John Collier

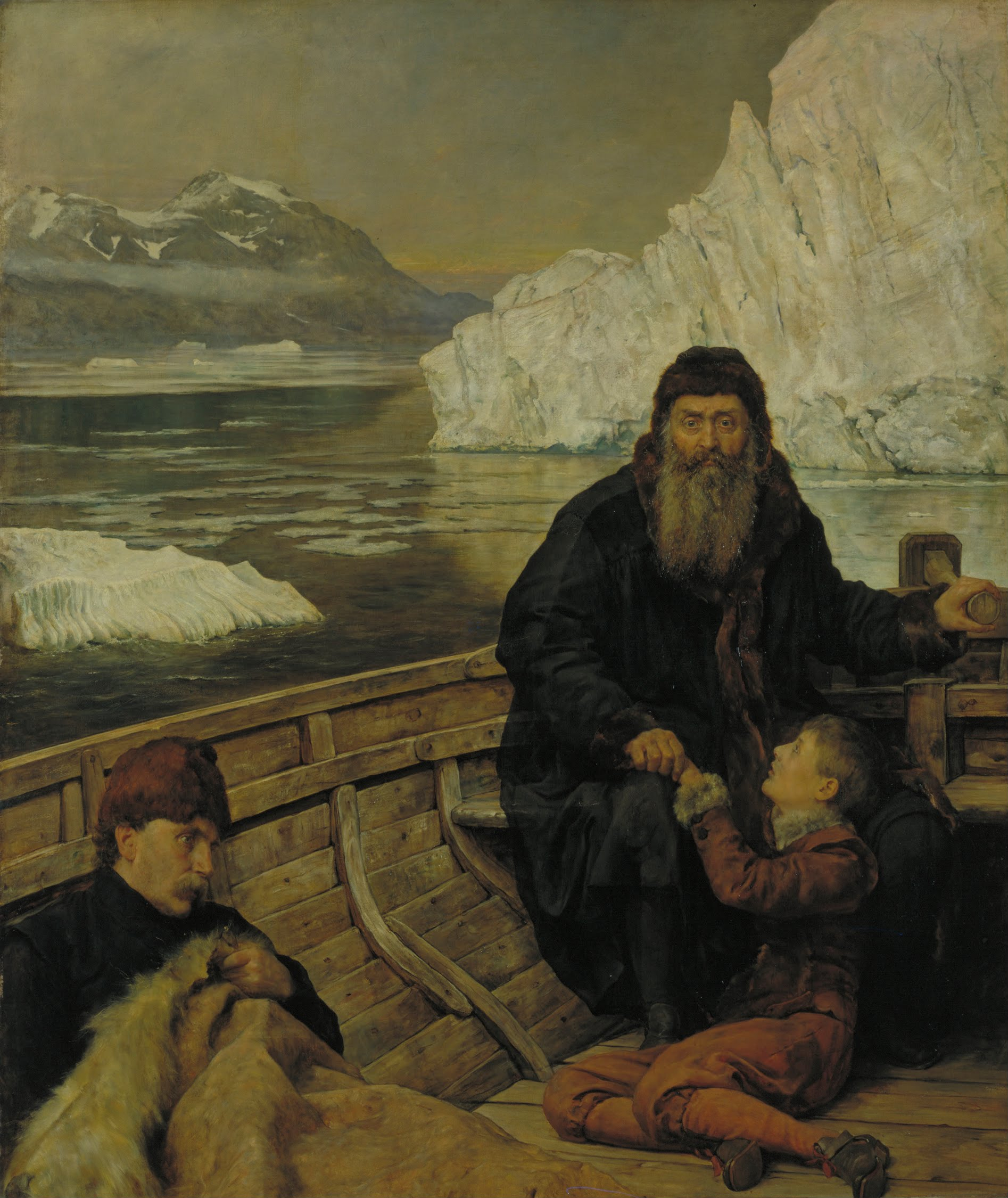
- Artist: John Collier
- Year: 1881
- Medium: Oil on canvas
- Dimensions: 214 cm × 183.5 cm (84 in × 72.2 in)
- Location: Tate Britain, London

The Last Voyage of Henry Hudson is an oil-on-canvas painting by English artist John Collier, created in 1881. It is part of the Tate Britain collections since 1881.

== History and description ==
The painting depicts the historical event that happened during English navigator Henry Hudson final voyage to search for the Northwest Passage, when his crew mutinied in Hudson Bay, and he, his son and others were abandoned in a small boat, on 23 June 1611. It is unknown what happened to Hudson, his son and his men after this, but its presumed that they eventually died of cold or starvation.

Collier depicts Hudson, dressed in black and with a grey beard, at the rudder of his ship, staring eerily while holding the hand of his son, who is at his feet. To the left, a mustached man with a vague gaze covers himself with a fur blanket. The vast, desolated Arctic landscape, with an iceberg and a snow-covered mountain visible to the left, serves as the background to the human drama that has unfolded. The painting drew the attention of his contemporary viewers to the ongoing Arctic explorations in the 19th century, including other attempts to find the Northwest Passage.
