= John Collier (painter) =

English painter and writer (1850–1934)

The Honourable John Collier OBE RP ROI
- John Collier by his first wife Marian, née Huxley, 1882
- Born: John Maler Collier; 27 January 1850; Paddington, Middlesex
- Died: 11 April 1934 (aged 84); Eton Avenue, London
- Education: Eton; Slade School of Fine Art
- Known for: Painter
- Movement: Pre-Raphaelite; Orientalism
- Spouses: Marian Huxley; Ethel Huxley

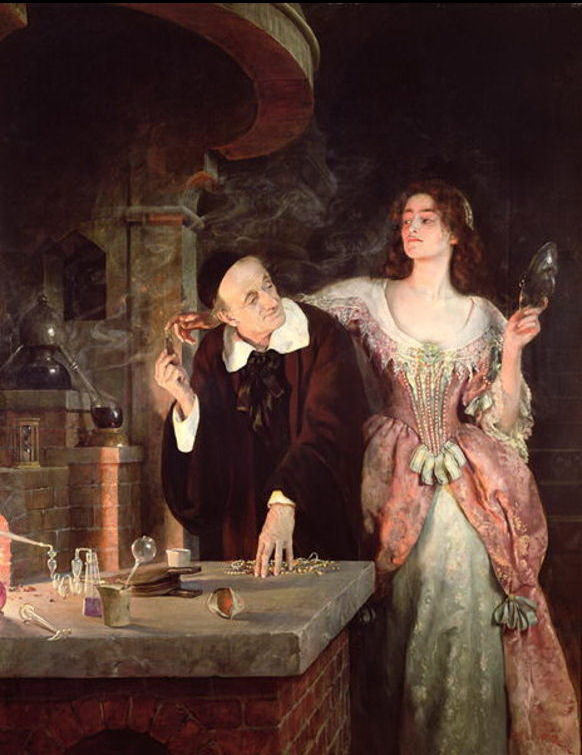
The Laboratory (1895) from Robert Browning's classic revenge poem. Now in the collection of The Arts of Imagination Foundation.

John Maler Collier OBE ROI RP (/ˈkɒliər/; 27 January 1850 – 11 April 1934) was an English painter and writer. He was one of the most prominent portrait painters of his generation, and also created history paintings that were usually imaginary portraits of one or two figures from literature, myth, or history. Both of his marriages were to daughters of Thomas Henry Huxley. He was educated at Eton College, and he studied painting in Paris with Jean-Paul Laurens and at the Munich Academy starting in 1875.

== Family ==
Collier was from a talented and successful family. His grandfather, John Collier, was a Quaker merchant who became a member of parliament. His father, Robert (a member of parliament, Attorney General and, for many years, a full-time judge of the Privy Council) was created the first Lord Monkswell. Collier was a member of the New Society of Artists as well as the Royal Society of British Artists. He had artists' studios in his home at 7 Chelsea Embankment for the use of John and his wife Marion. John Collier's elder brother, the second Lord Monkswell, was Under-Secretary of State for War and Chairman of the London County Council.

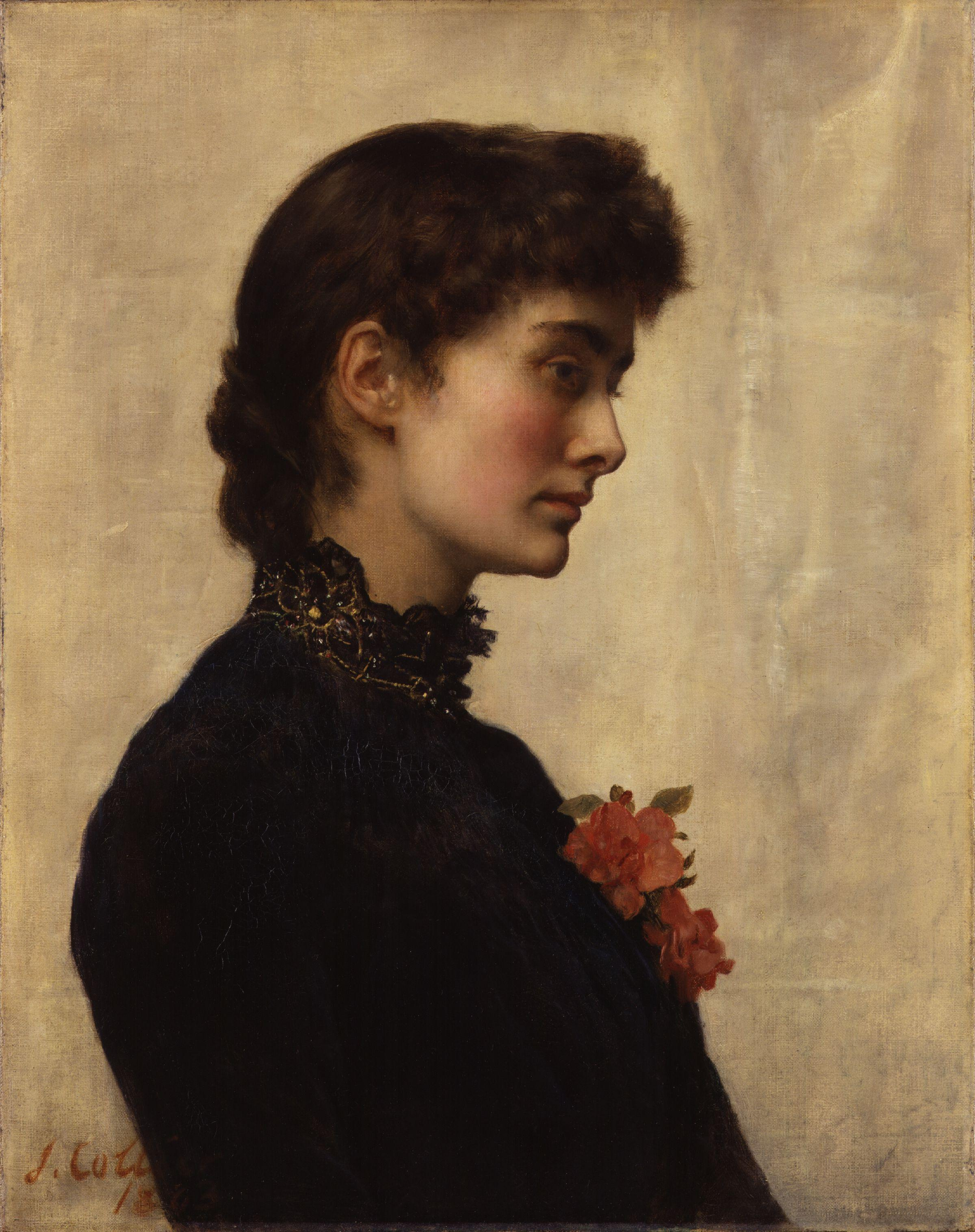
Collier's first wife, Marian Huxley, painted by her husband in 1883

In due course, Collier became an integral part of the family of Thomas Henry Huxley PC, President of the Royal Society from 1883 to 1885. Collier married two of Huxley's daughters and was "on terms of intimate friendship" with his son, the writer Leonard Huxley. Collier's first wife, in 1879, was Marian Huxley (Mady). She was a painter who studied, like her husband, at the Slade and exhibited at the Royal Academy and elsewhere. In 1881, the couple settled in Tite Street, Chelsea, in a purpose-built studio house, alongside their friend Anna Lea Merritt. After the birth of their only child—a daughter, Joyce—Marian suffered severe post-natal depression and was taken to Paris for treatment where, however, she contracted pneumonia and died in 1887. Joyce became a portrait miniaturist and was a member of the Royal Society of Miniature Painters.

In 1889 Collier married Mady's younger sister Ethel Huxley. Until the Deceased Wife's Sister's Marriage Act 1907 such a marriage was not possible in England, so the ceremony took place in Norway. By his second wife he had a daughter and a son, Sir Laurence Collier, who was the British ambassador to Norway 1941–1951.

== Subjects ==
Collier's range of portrait subjects was broad. In 1893, for example, his subjects included Lovelace Stamer, Bishop of Shrewsbury; Sir John Lubbock FRS; A N Hornby (Captain of the Lancashire Eleven); Edward Augustus Inglefield (Admiral and Arctic explorer).

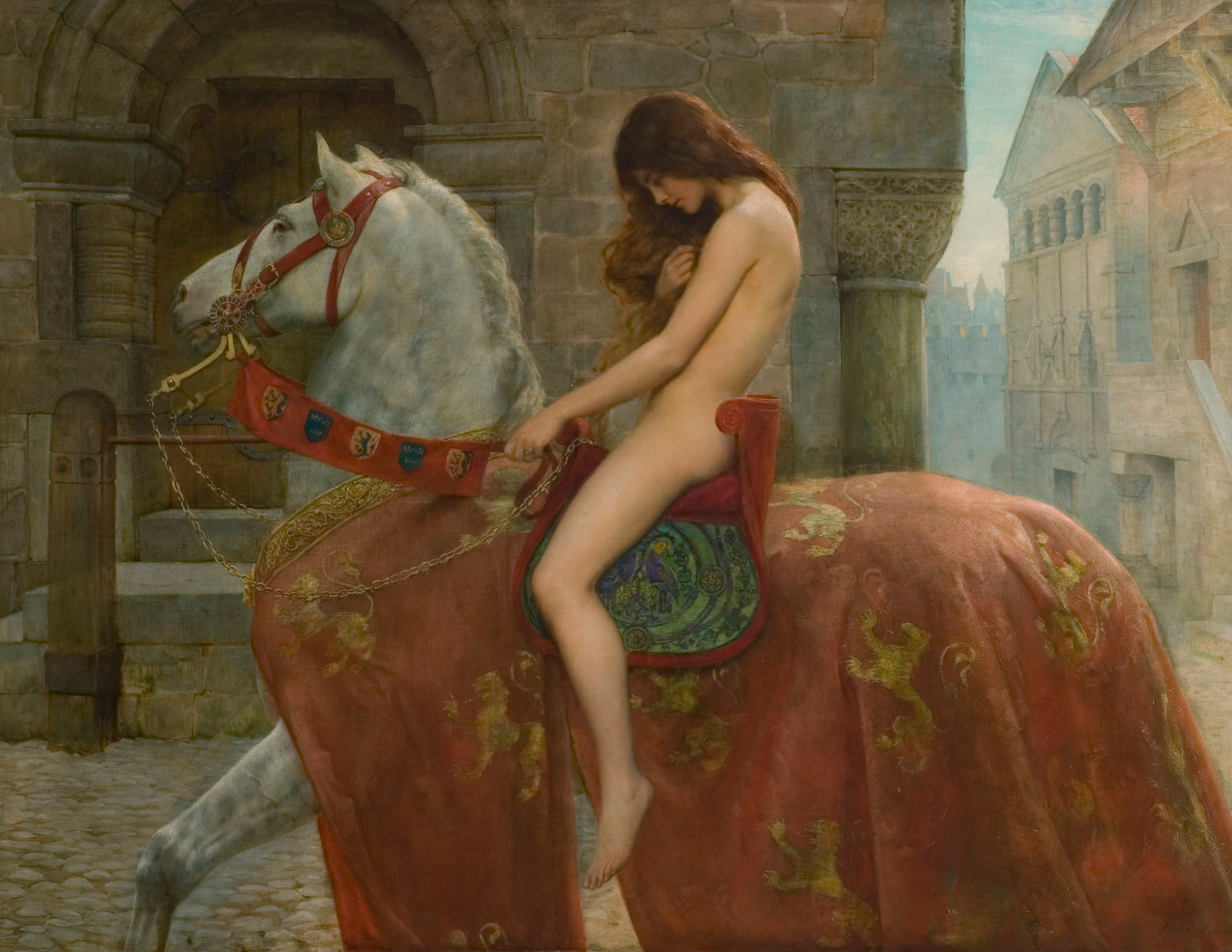
Lady Godiva (1898) Herbert Art Gallery & Museum

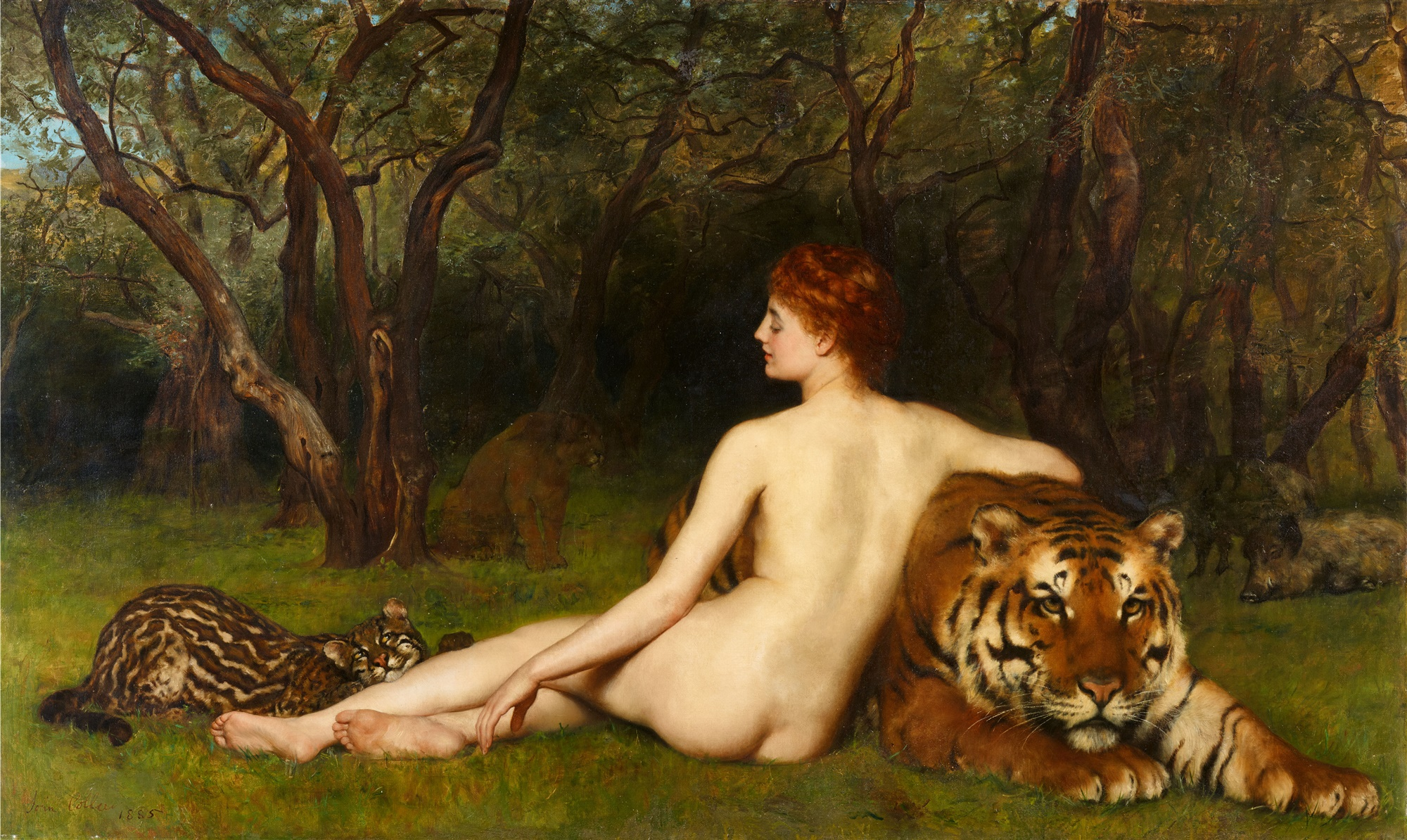
Circe (1885) the seductive enchantress from Homer's Odyssey

His commissioned portrait of the Duke of York (later George V) as Master of Trinity House in 1901, and the Prince of Wales (later Edward VIII) were his major royal portraits. The latter work was hung in Durbar Hall, Jodhpur, Rajputana.

Other subjects included two Lord Chancellors (the Earl of Selborne in 1882 and the Earl of Halsbury) in 1897; The Speaker of the House of Commons, William Gully, (1897); senior legal figures the Lord Chief Justice Lord Alverstone (1912) and the Master of the Rolls Sir George Jessel (1881).

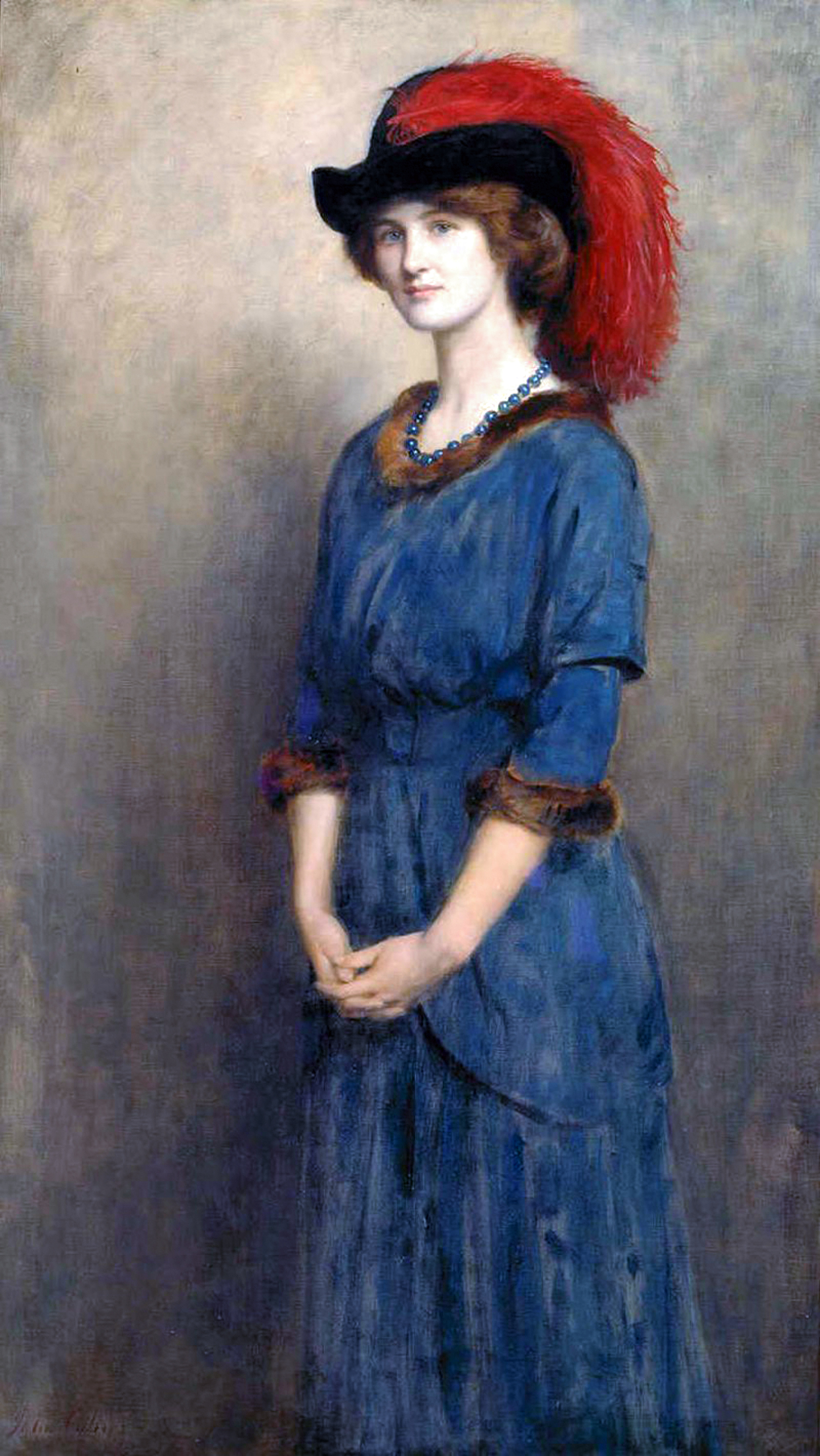
Angela McInnes by Collier, 1914

Rudyard Kipling (1891); the painter Sir Lawrence Alma-Tadema (1884); the actors J.L. Toole (1887) and Madge Kendal, Ellen Terry and Herbert Beerbohm Tree (in The Merry Wives of Windsor) (1904); heads of educational institutions such as the Master of Balliol Edward Caird (1904), the Warden of Wadham G.E. Thorley (1889) and the Provost of Eton (1897) were also subjects for Collier. His portraits also include those of soldiers such as Field Marshal Lord Kitchener of Khartoum (1911) and Field Marshal Sir Frederick Haines (1891); two Indian maharajahs, including the Maharajah of Nepal (1910); and scientists including Charles Darwin (1882), the artist's father-in-law Professor Huxley (1891), William Kingdom Clifford, James Prescott Joule and Sir Michael Foster (1907). Clark reports a total of thirty-two Huxley family portraits during the half-century after his first marriage.

A photocopy of John Collier's Sitters Book (made in 1962 from the original in the possession of the artist's son) can be consulted in the Heinz Archive and Library, National Portrait Gallery. This is the artist's own handwritten record of all his portraits, including name of subject, date, fee charged, and details of any major exhibitions of the picture in question.

== Posthumous reputation ==
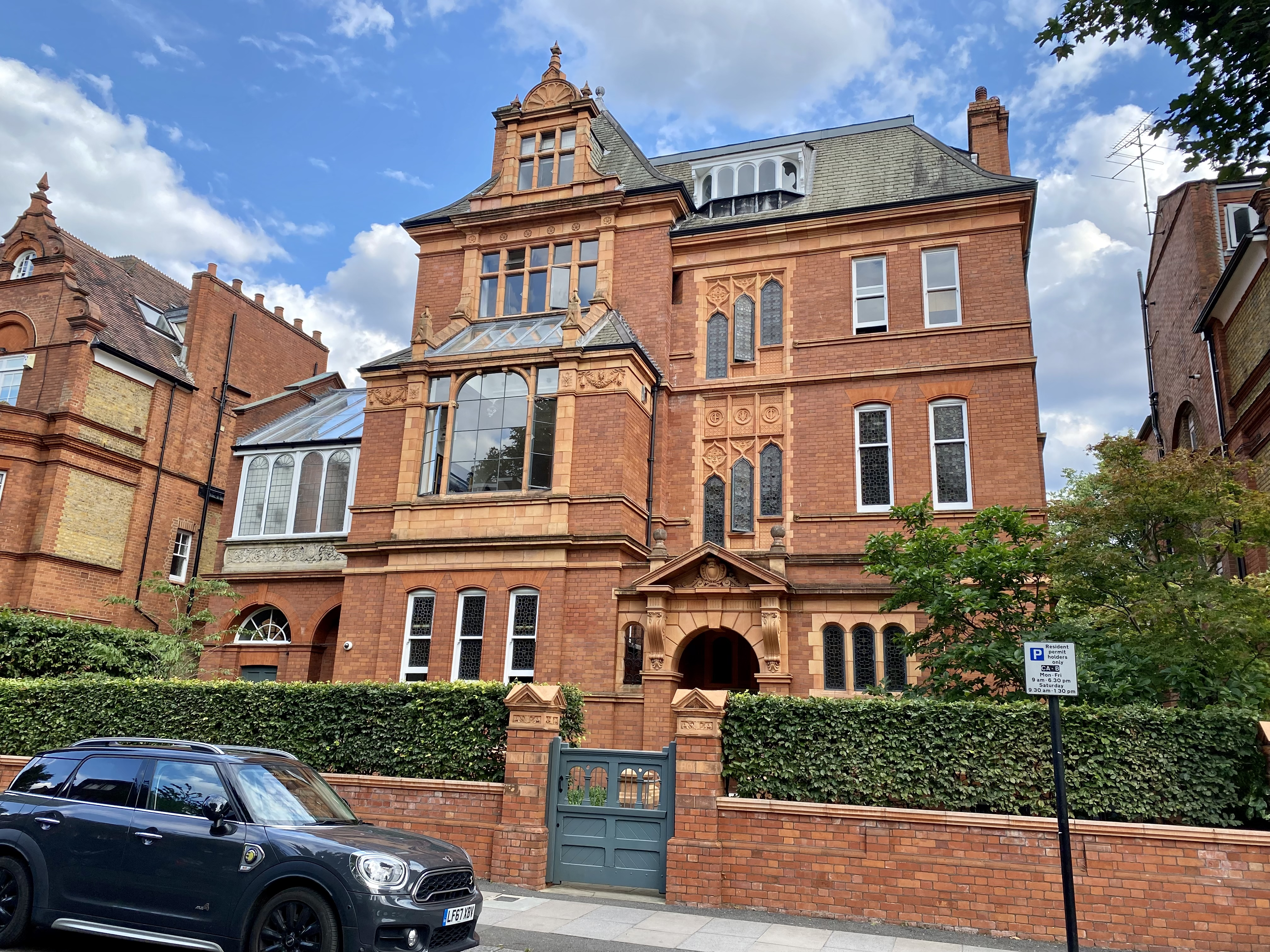
North House at 69 Eton Avenue in Belsize Park. Built for Collier in 1890 by Frederick S. Waller.

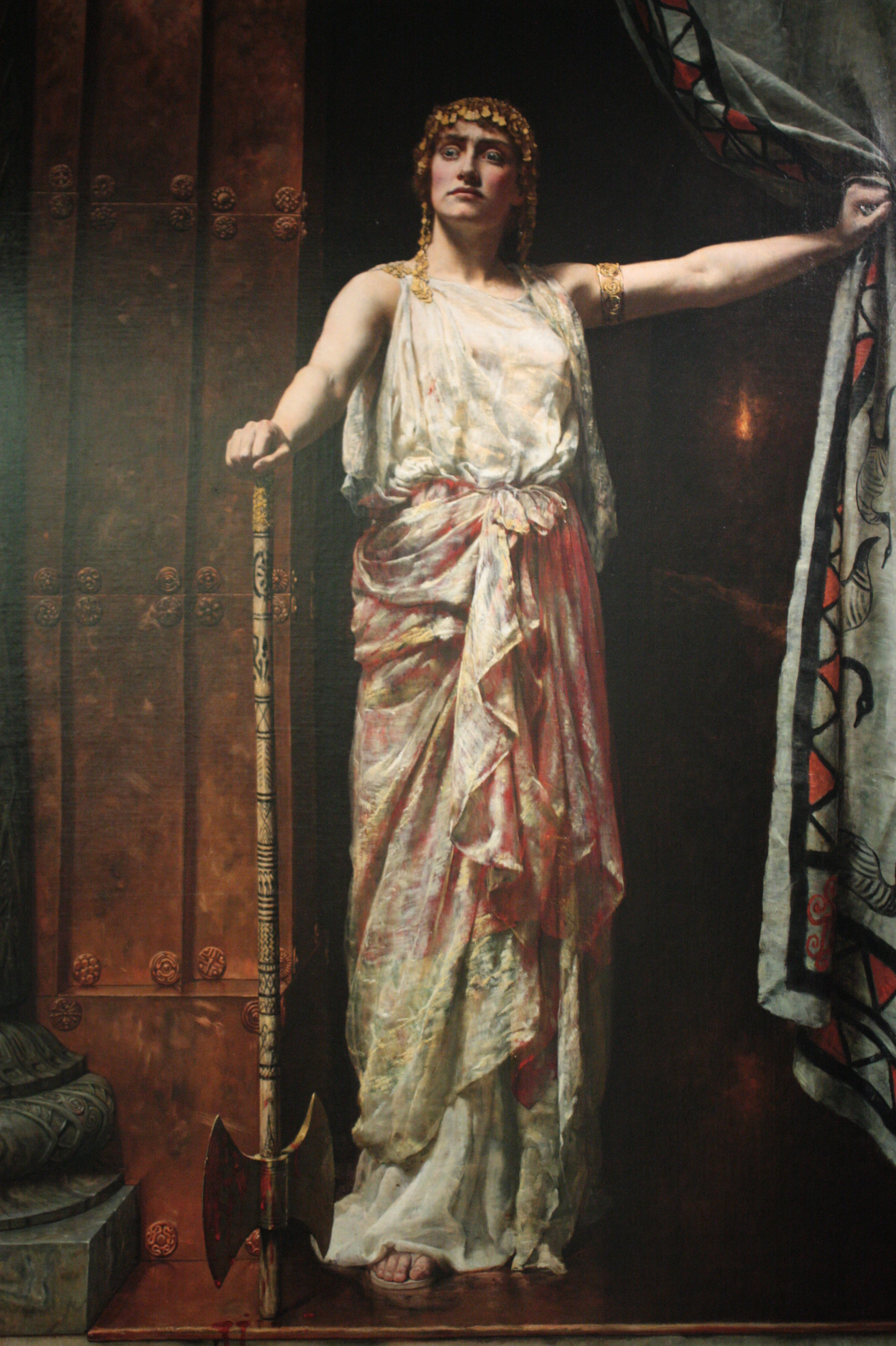
Clytemnestra after the Murder (1882)

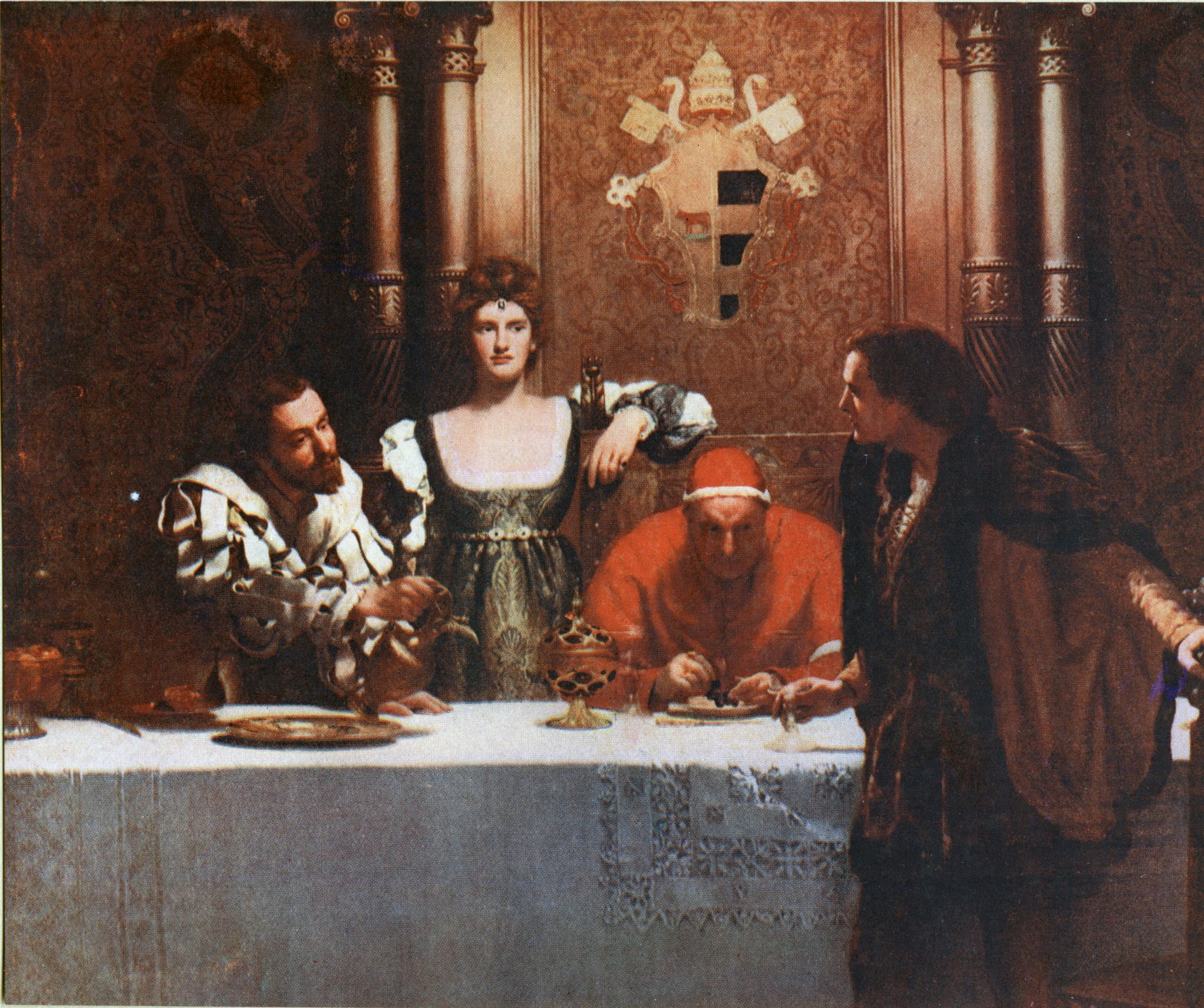
A glass of wine with Caesar Borgia (1893)

Collier died in 1934. His entry in the Dictionary of National Biography (volume for 1931–40, published 1949) compares his work to that of Frank Holl because of its solemnity. This is only true, however, of his many portraits of distinguished old men – his portraits of younger men, women and children, and his so-called "problem pictures", covering scenes of ordinary life, are often very bright and fresh.

His entry in the Dictionary of Art (1996 vol 7, p569), by Geoffrey Ashton, refers to the invisibility of his brush strokes as a "rather unexciting and flat use of paint" but contrasts that with "Collier's strong and surprising sense of colour" which "created a disconcerting verisimilitude in both mood and appearance".

The Dictionary of Portrait Painters in Britain up to 1920 (1997) describes his portraits as "painterly works with a fresh use of light and colour".

== Public collections ==
Sixteen of John Collier's paintings are now in the collections of the National Portrait Gallery in London, and two are in the Tate Gallery. Four of the National Portrait Gallery paintings were in December 1997 on display: John Burns, Sir William Huggins, Thomas Huxley (the artist's father in law) and Charles Darwin (copies of the last two are also prominently displayed at the top of the staircase at the Athenaeum Club in London).

A 1907 self-portrait has been preserved in the Uffizi in Florence which presumably commissioned it as part of its celebrated collection of artists' self-portraits.

Other pictures may be seen in houses and institutions open to the public: his Clytemnestra, a large and striking painting of the mythical figure, is in the Guildhall Gallery of the City of London. Another version, in which Clytemnestra has committed the murder and stands half-naked by the bath with a bloody sword is in the Worcester City Art Gallery & Museum. Sentence of Death was given by the widow of the artist to Wolverhampton Art Gallery. His portrait of the Earl of Onslow (1903), is at Clandon Park, Surrey (National Trust). His full-length portrait of Sir Charles Tertius Mander, first baronet, is at Owlpen Manor, Gloucestershire, with another version in the collection of the National Trust at Wightwick Manor, and his Lady Godiva is in the Herbert Art Gallery and Museum. A glass of wine with Caesar Borgia (1893) can be seen hanging in the atrium of Ipswich Town Hall.

Reproductions of many others, from various collections, may be consulted in the John Collier box in the National Portrait Gallery Heinz Archive and Library, and a good selection is published in The Art of the Honourable John Collier by W.H. Pollock (1914). His work was also included in the Great Victorian Pictures exhibition mounted by the Arts Council in 1978 (catalogue, p27).

== Views on ethics and religion ==
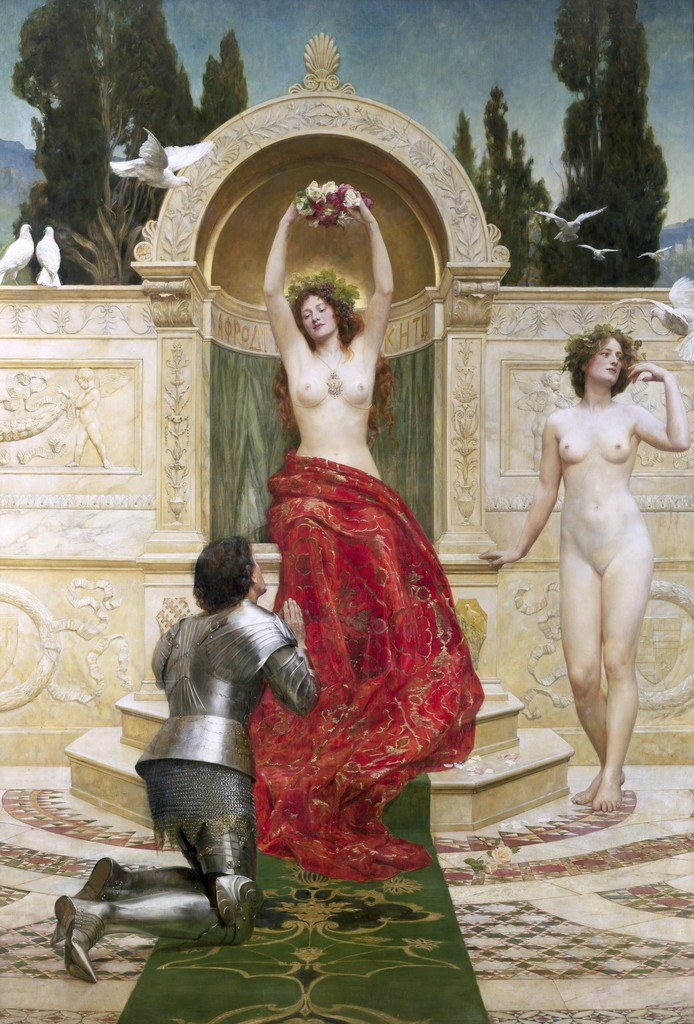
In the Venusberg (1901)

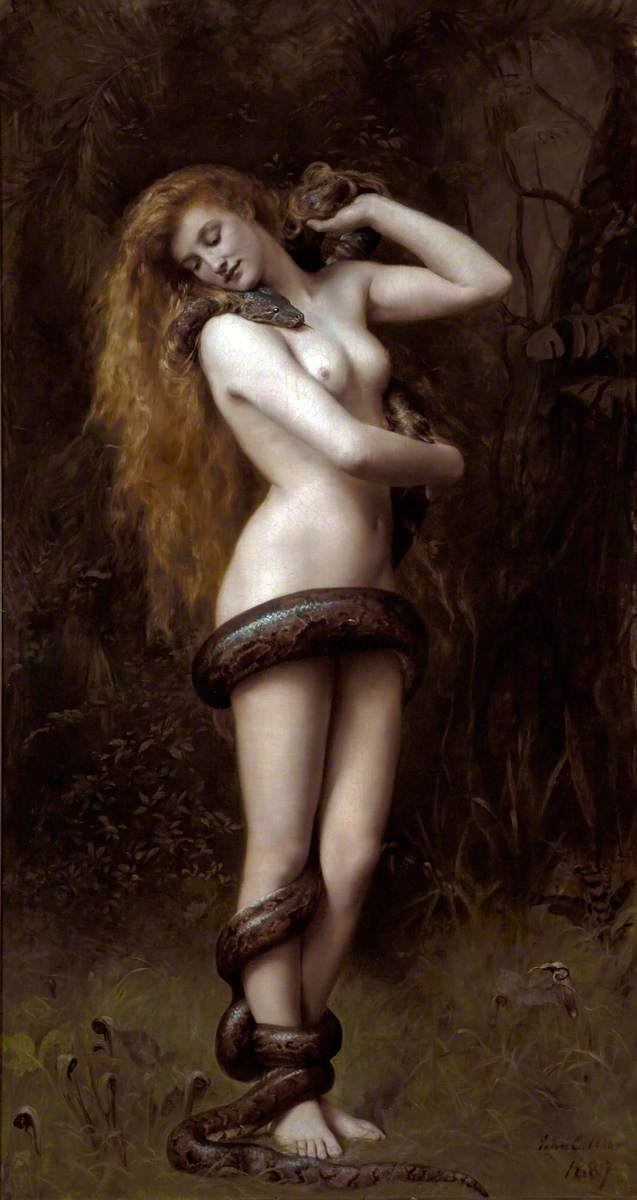
Lilith, (1887) now held at the Atkinson Art Gallery in Southport, Merseyside.

Collier's views on religion and ethics have been compared with the views of Thomas and Julian Huxley, both of whom gave Romanes lectures on that subject. Collier (1926) explains

"It [the book The Religion of an Artist] is mostly concerned with ethics apart from religion ... I am looking forward to a time when ethics will have taken the place of religion ... My religion is really negative. [The benefits of religion] can be attained by other means which are less conducive to strife and which put less strain upon the reasoning faculties."

On secular morality:

"My standard is frankly utilitarian. As far as morality is intuitive, I think it may be reduced to an inherent impulse of kindliness towards our fellow citizens."

His views on ethics, then, were very close to the agnosticism of T.H. Huxley and the humanism of Julian Huxley.

On the idea of God:

"People may claim without much exaggeration that the belief in God is universal. They omit to add that superstition, often of the most degraded kind, is just as universal."

And

"An omnipotent Deity who sentences even the vilest of his creatures to eternal torture is infinitely more cruel than the cruellest man."

And on the Church:

"To me, as to most Englishmen, the triumph of Roman Catholicism would mean an unspeakable disaster to the cause of civilization."

And on non-conformists:

"They have a superstitious belief in the actual words of the Bible which is very dangerous".

== Publications ==
- A primer of art
- A Manual of Oil Painting, 1886
- The Art of Portrait Painting, 1905
- The religion of an artist, 1926

== Gallery ==
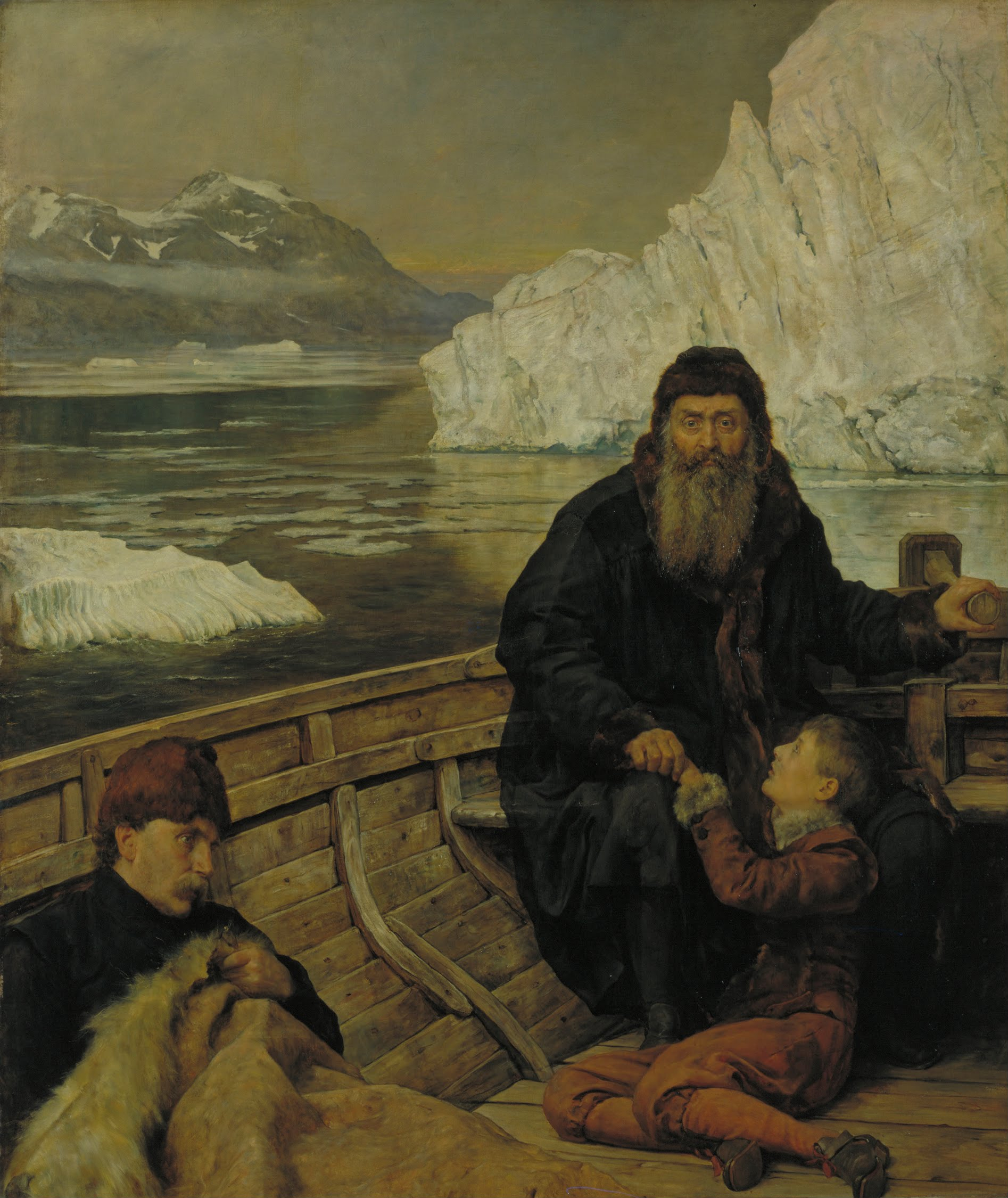
The Last Voyage of Henry Hudson (1881)

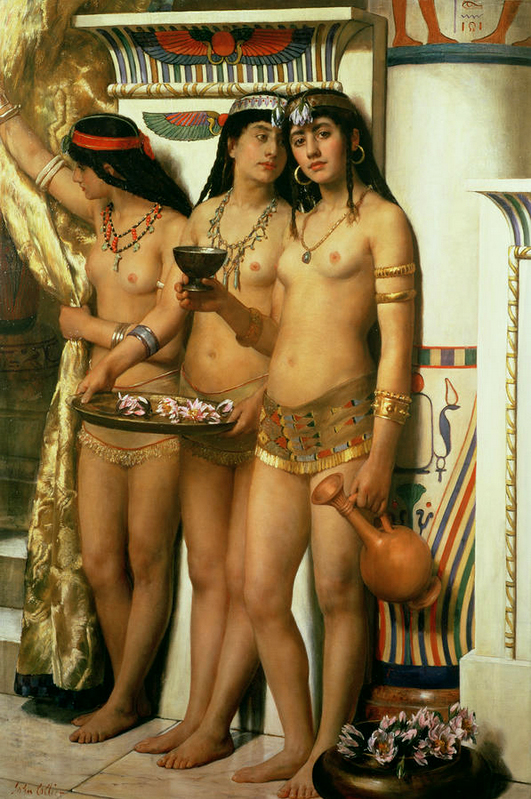
The Pharaoh's Handmaidens (1883)

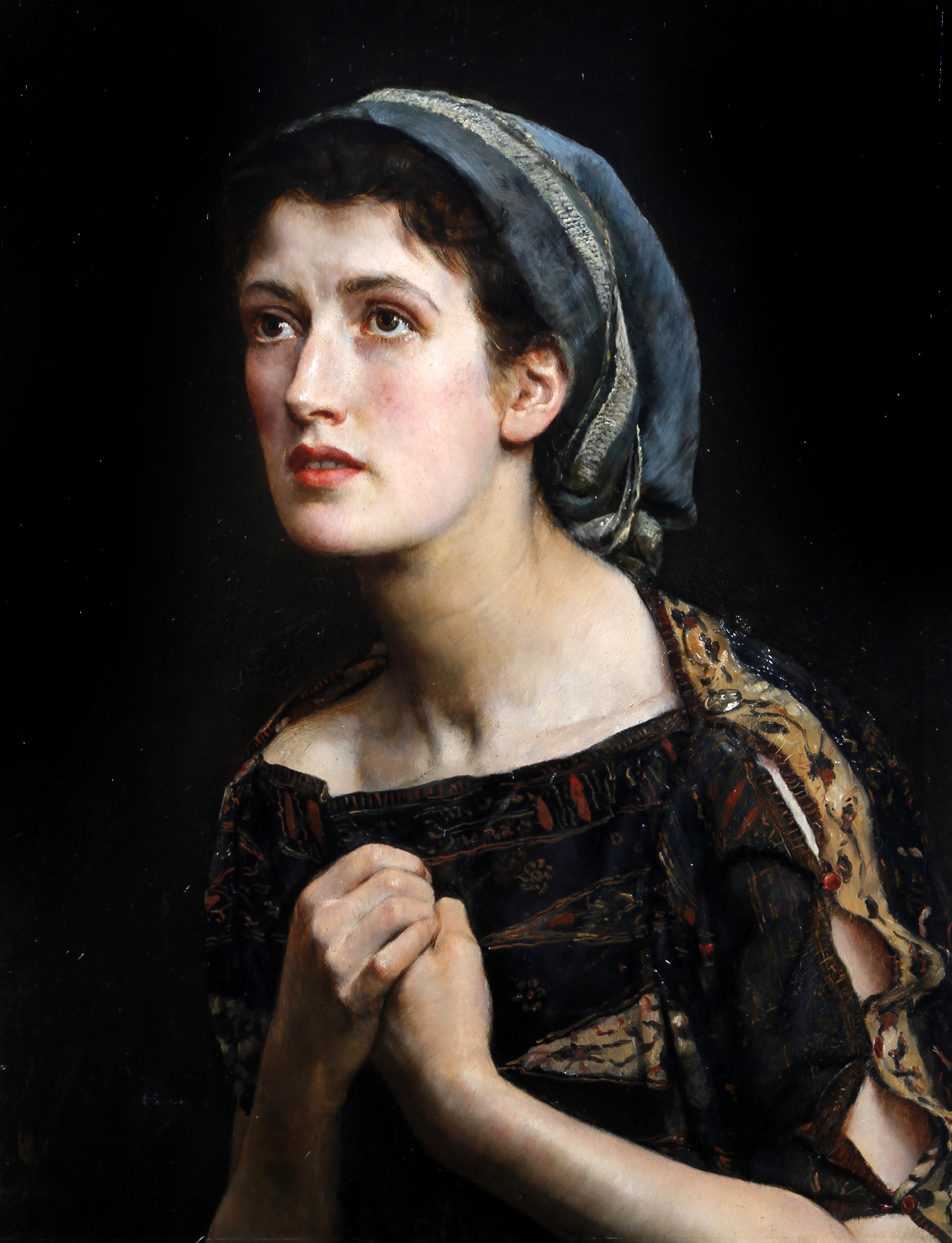
Cassandra (1885)

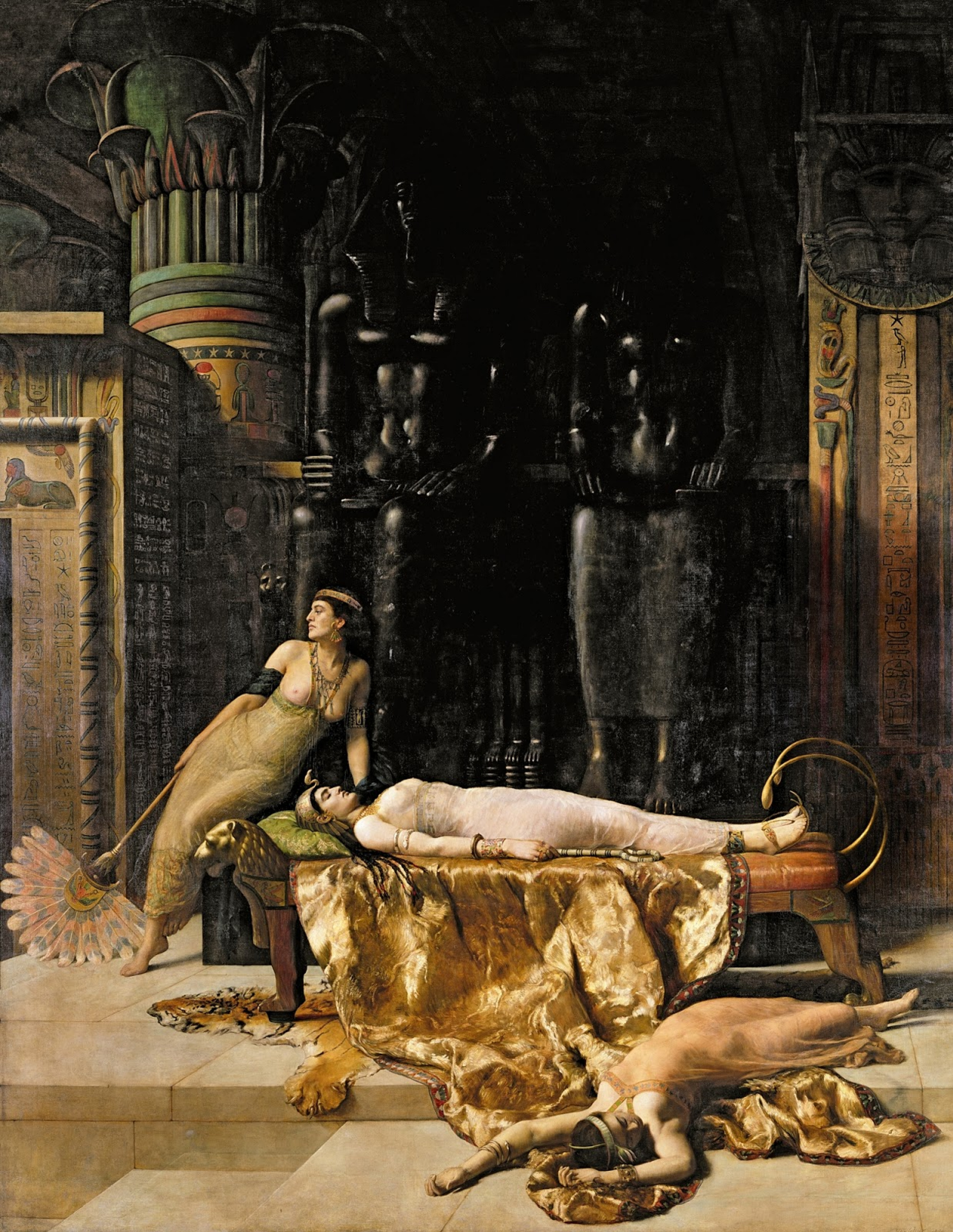
The Death of Cleopatra (1890)

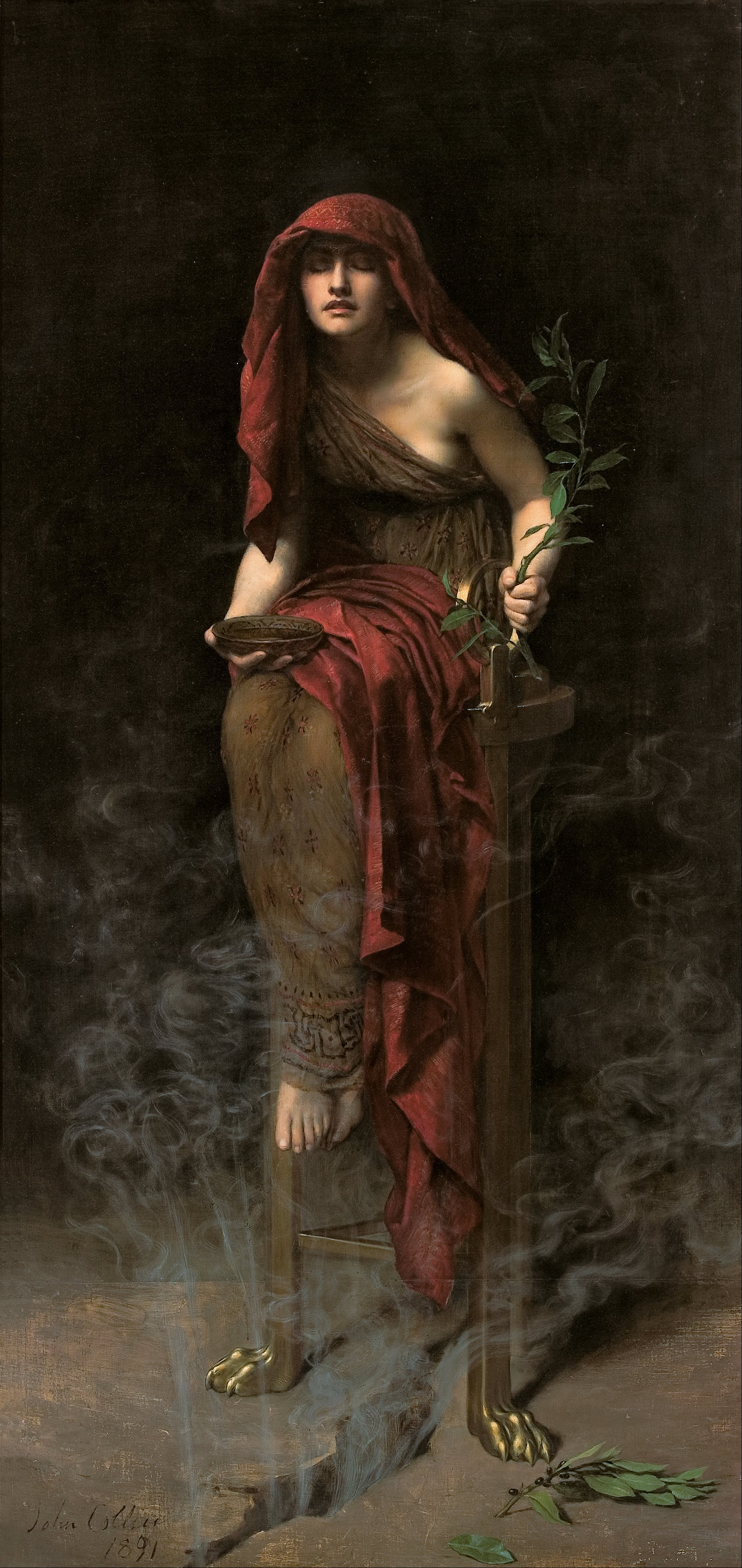
Priestess of Delphi (1891)

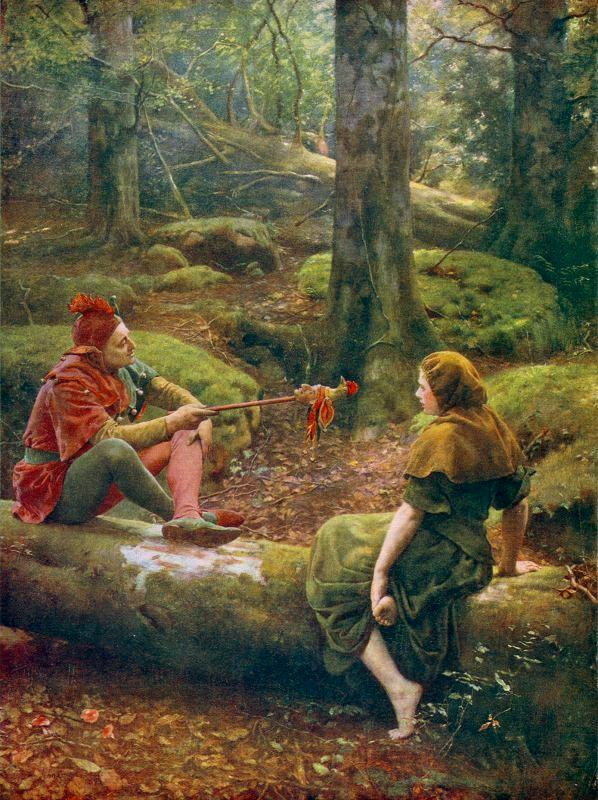
In the Forest of Arden (or Touchstone and Audrey) (1892)

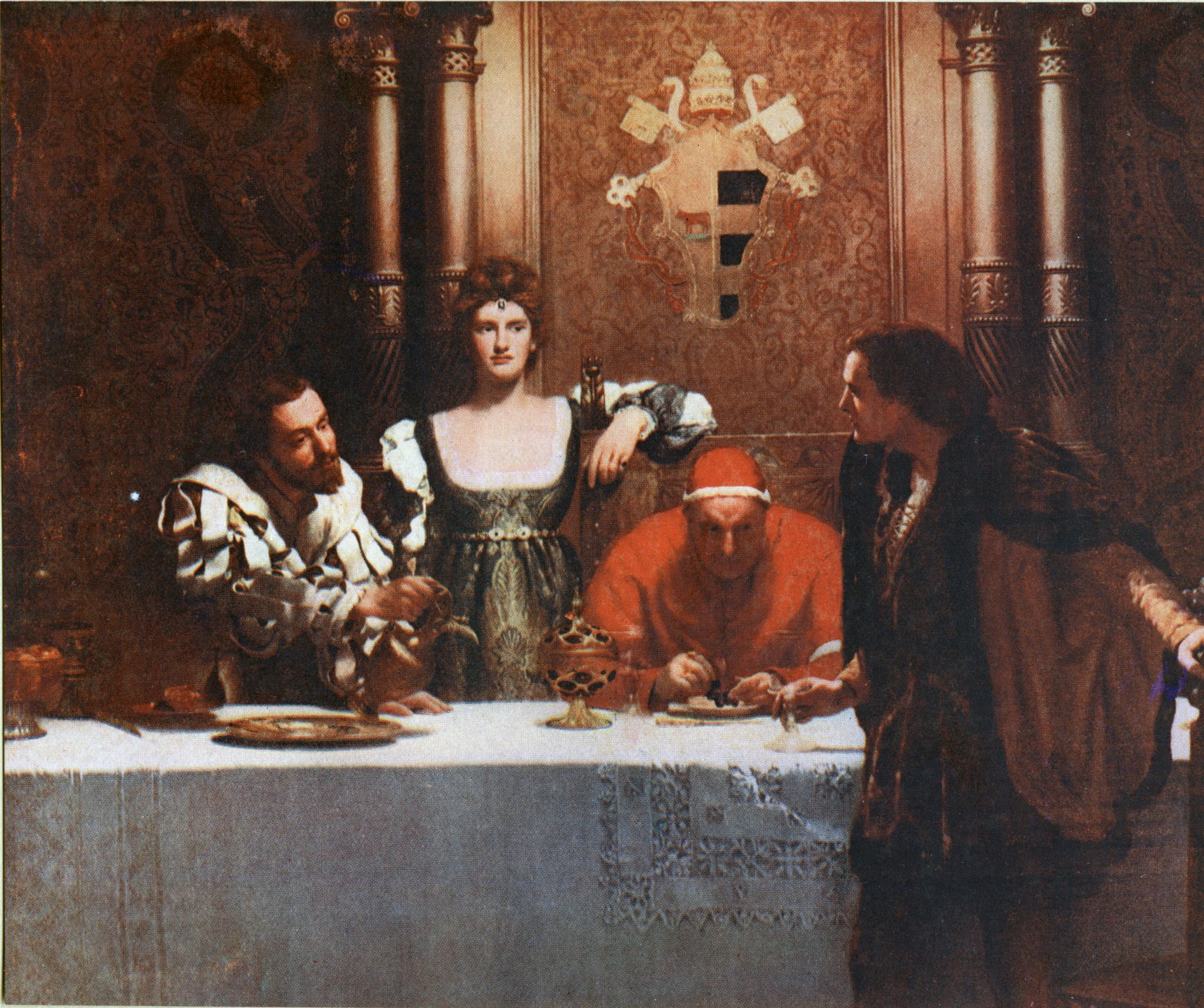
A Glass of Wine with Caesar Borgia (1893)

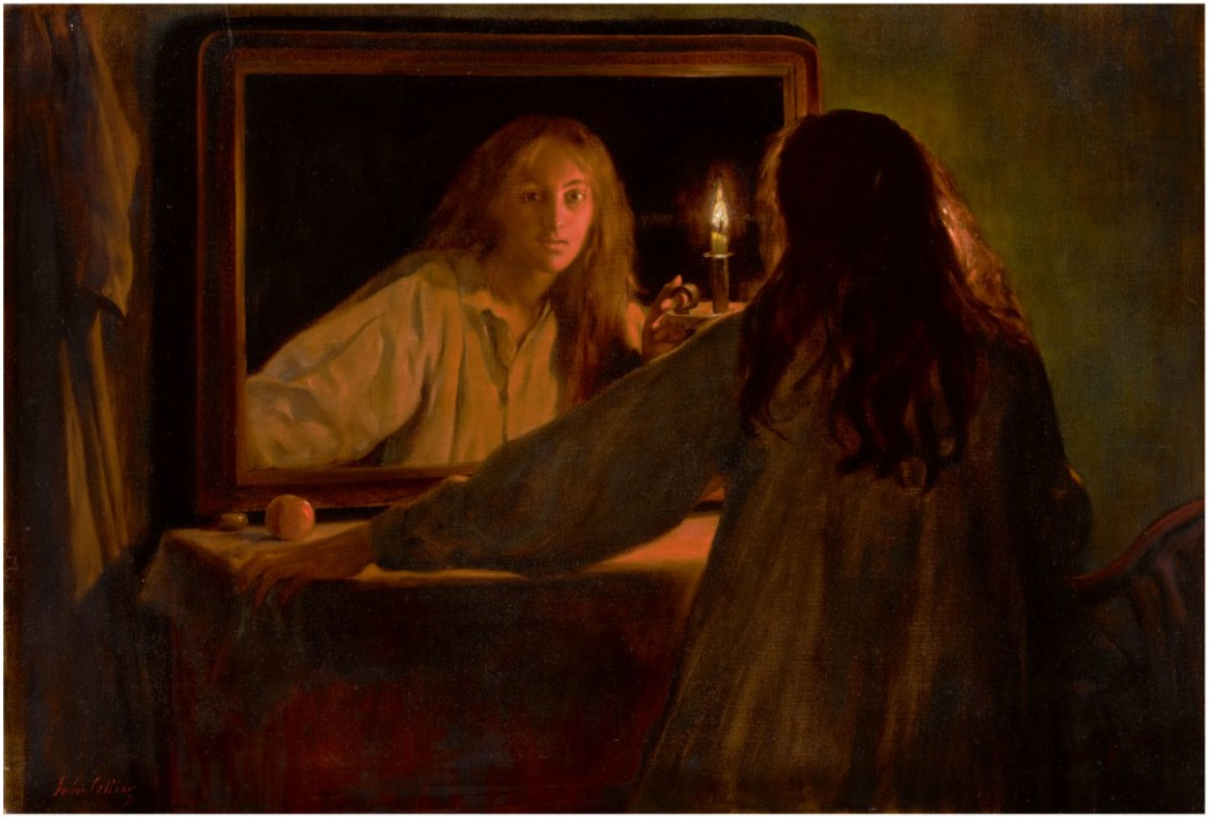
All Hallowe'en (1895)

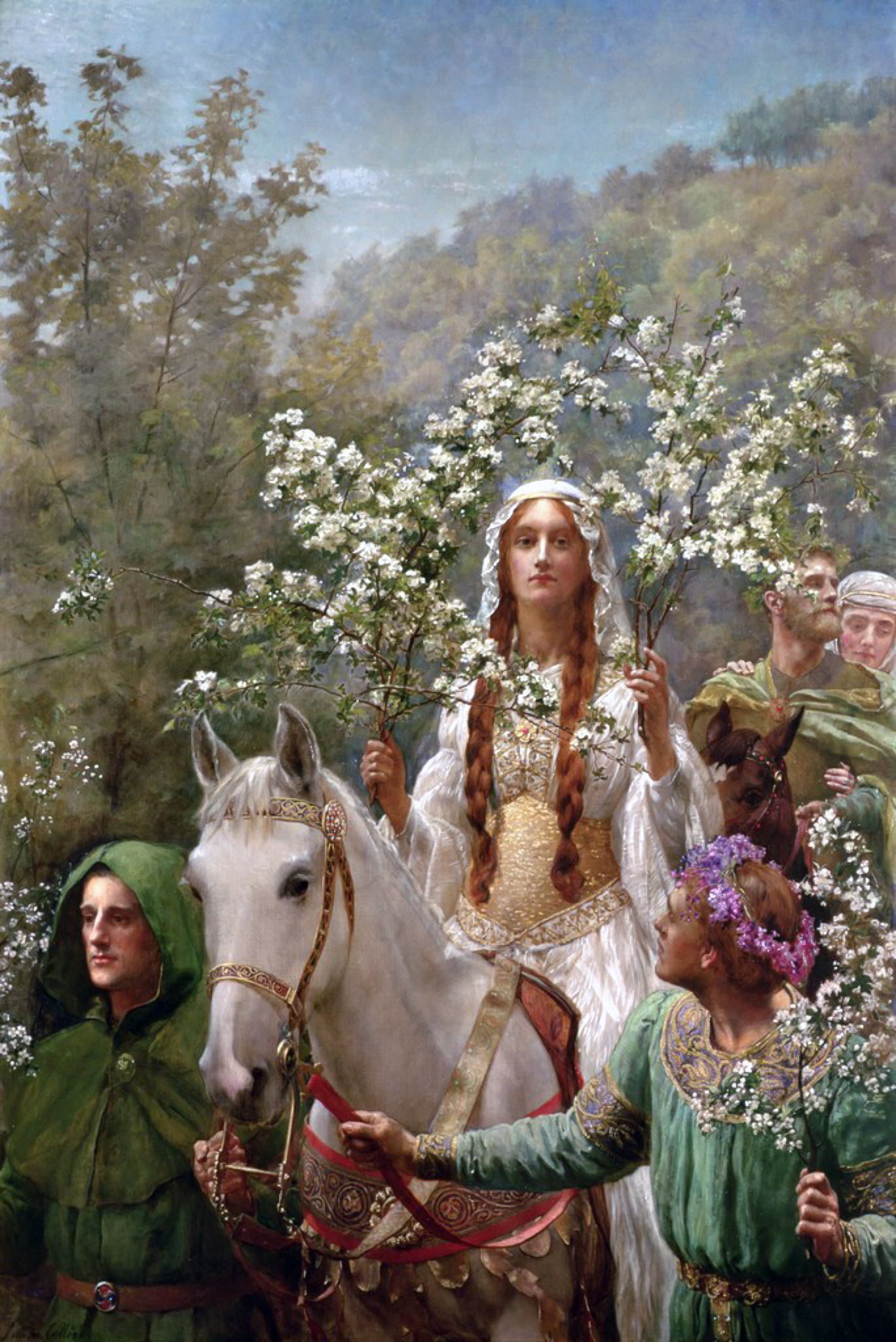
Queen Guinevere's Maying (1897)

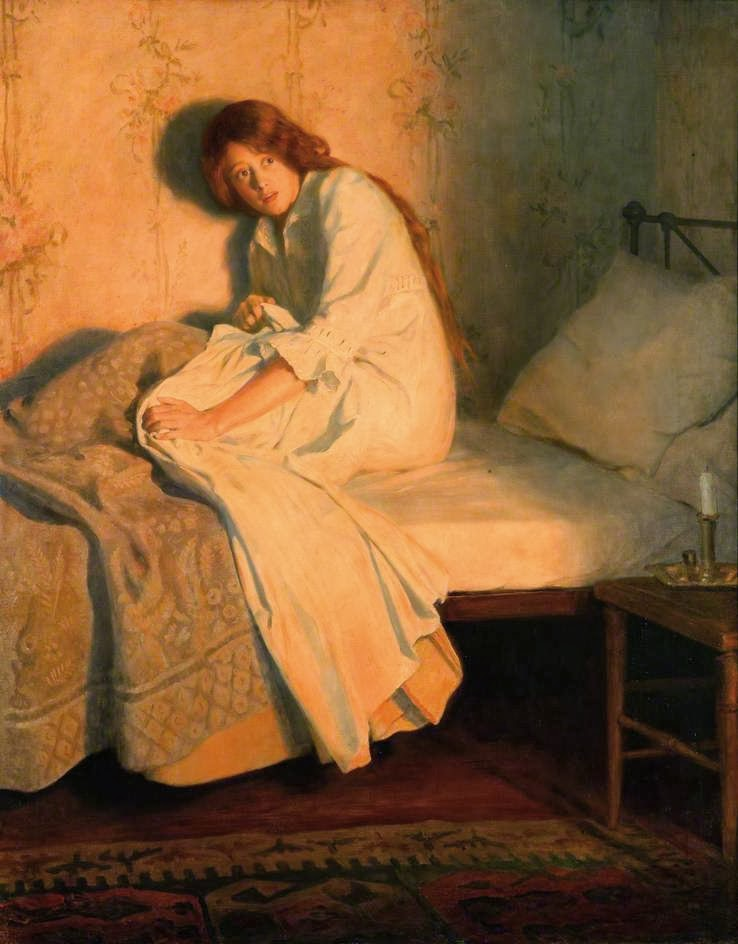
Fire (c. 1900)

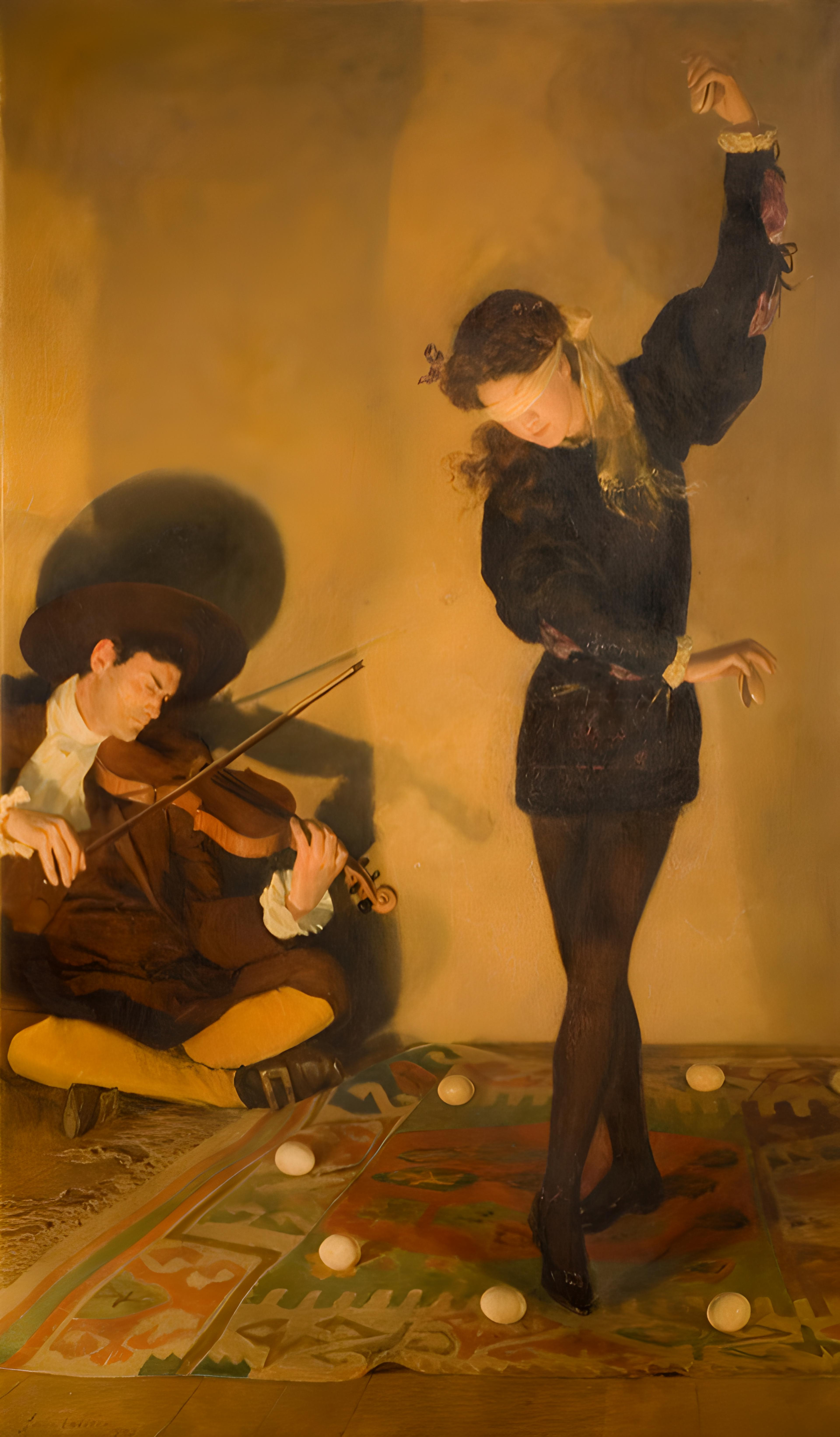
Egg dance (1903)

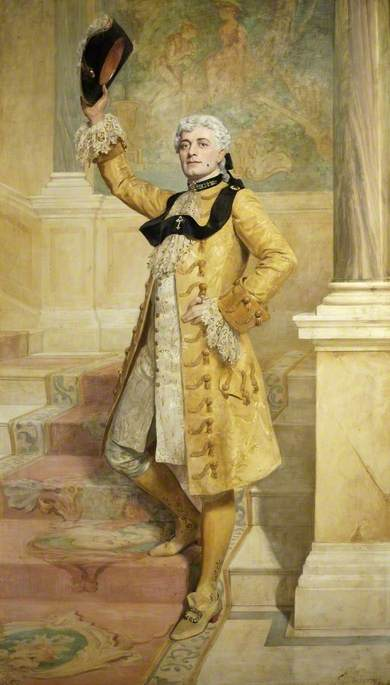
Lewis Waller as Monsieur Beaucaire (1903)

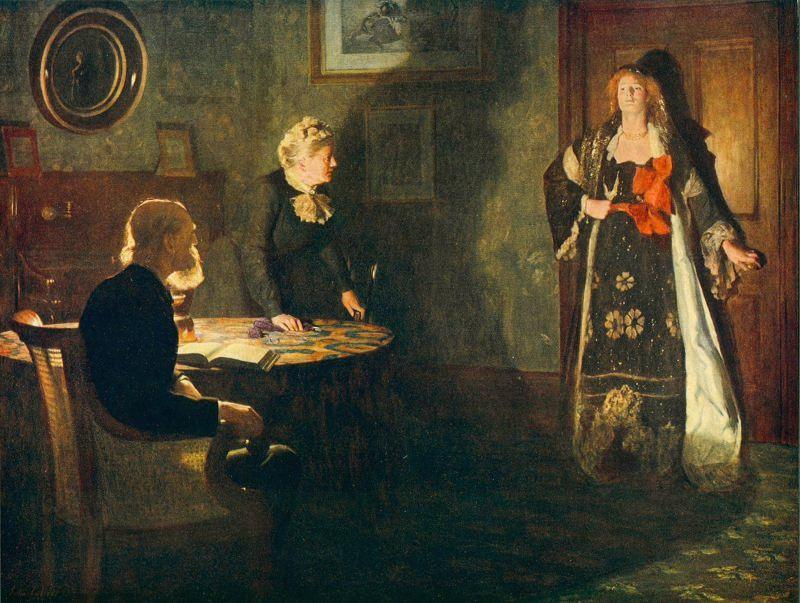
The Prodigal Daughter (1903)

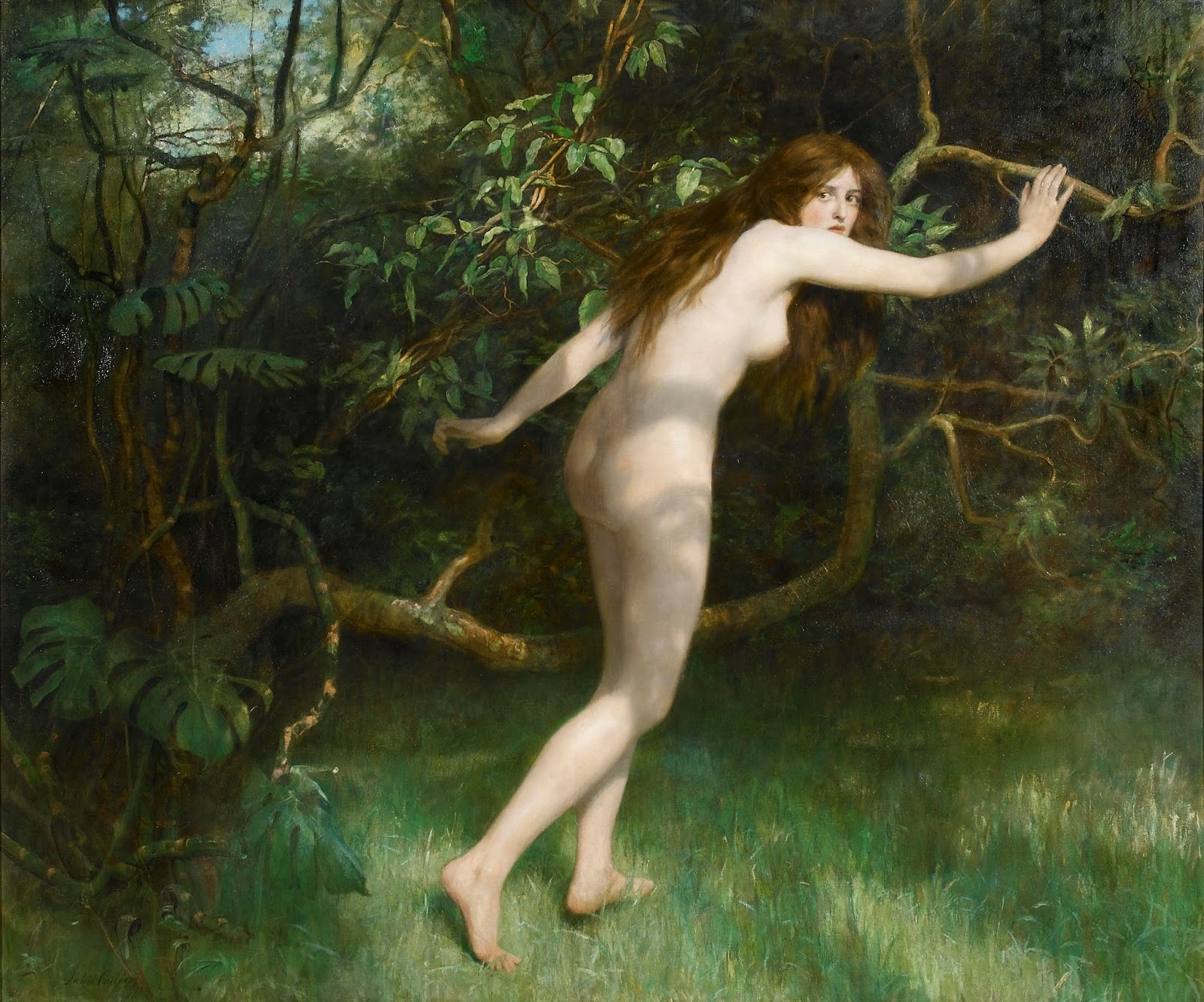
Eve (1911)

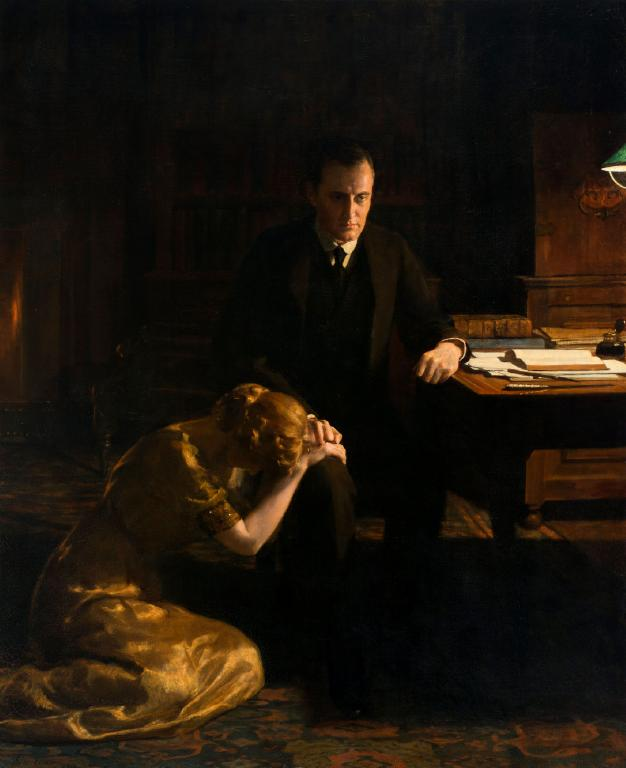
A Fallen Idol (1913)

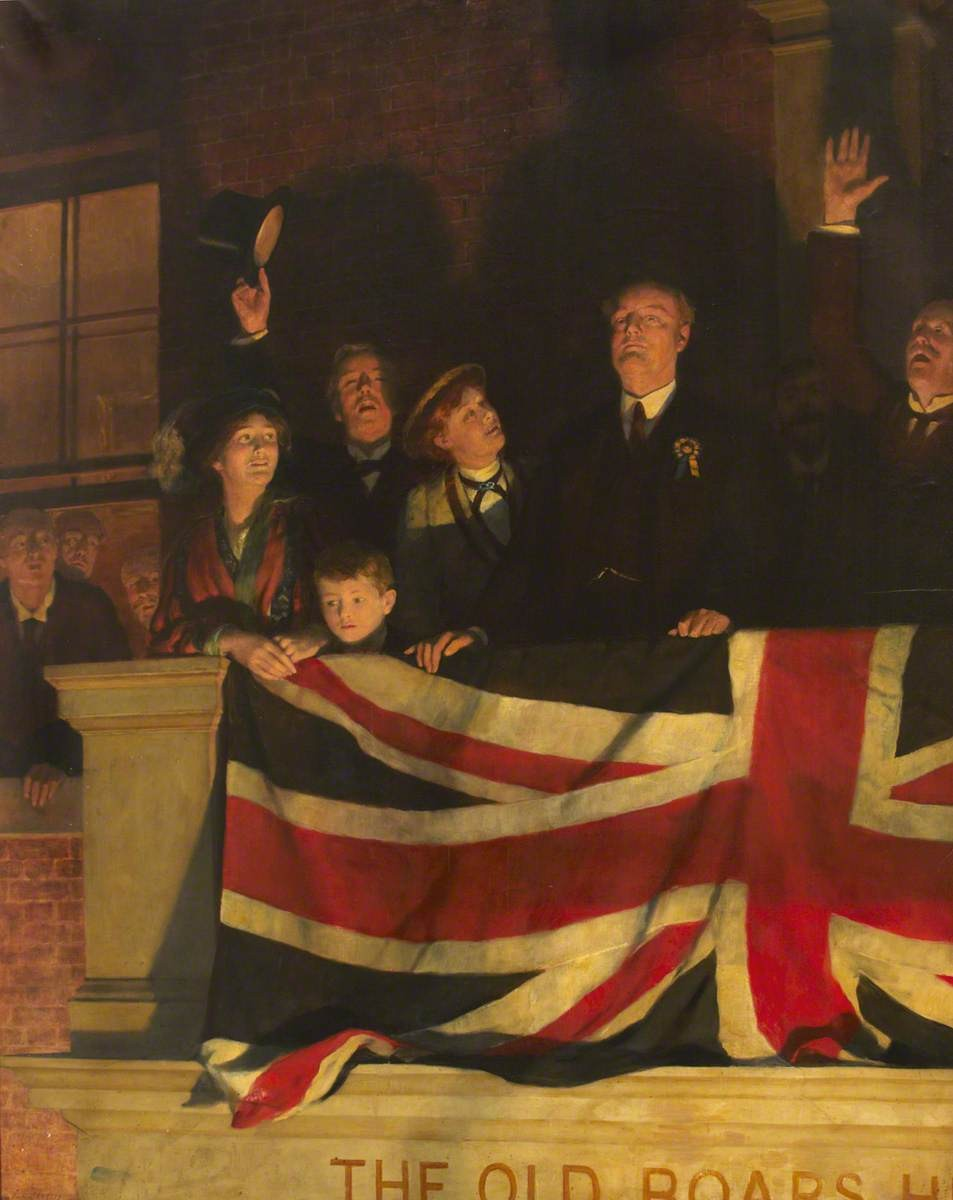
For King and Country (1916)

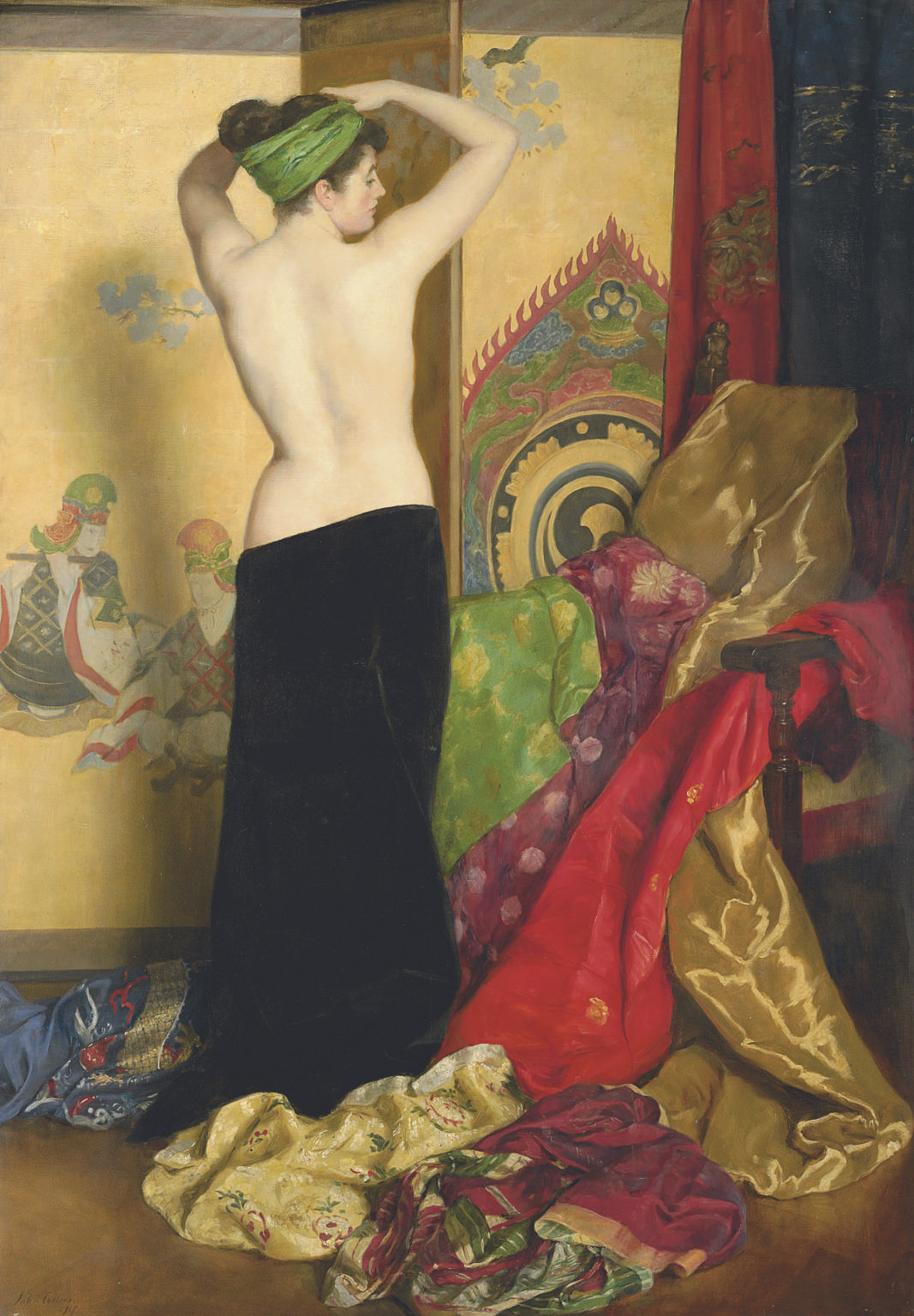
Pomps and Vanities (1917)

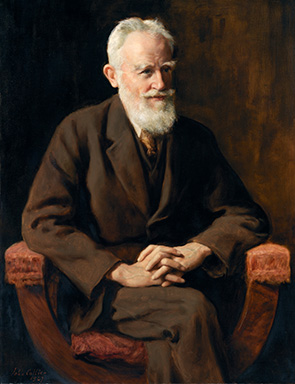
Portrait of George Bernard Shaw (1927)

== See also ==
- List of Pre-Raphaelite paintings – including the work of John Collier
