= List of United States Supreme Court cases, volume 223 =

Supreme Court of the United States
- Interactive map of Supreme Court of the United States
- 38°53′26″N 77°00′16″W
- Established: March 4, 1789; 236 years ago
- Location: Washington, D.C.
- Coordinates: 38°53′26″N 77°00′16″W
- Composition method: Presidential nomination with Senate confirmation
- Authorised by: Constitution of the United States, Art. III, § 1
- Judge term length: life tenure, subject to impeachment and removal
- Number of positions: 9 (by statute)
- Website: supremecourt.gov

This is a list of cases reported in volume 223 of United States Reports, decided by the Supreme Court of the United States in 1912.

== Justices of the Supreme Court at the time of volume 223 U.S. ==
The Supreme Court is established by Article III, Section 1 of the Constitution of the United States, which says: "The judicial Power of the United States, shall be vested in one supreme Court . . .". The size of the Court is not specified; the Constitution leaves it to Congress to set the number of justices. Under the Judiciary Act of 1789 Congress originally fixed the number of justices at six (one chief justice and five associate justices). Since 1789 Congress has varied the size of the Court from six to seven, nine, ten, and back to nine justices (always including one chief justice).

When the cases in volume 223 were decided the Court comprised the following eight members (following the death of Justice John Marshall Harlan):

Portrait	Justice	Office	Home State	Succeeded	Date confirmed by the Senate (Vote)	Tenure on Supreme Court
	Edward Douglass White	Chief Justice	Louisiana	Melville Fuller	December 12, 1910 (Acclamation)	December 19, 1910 – May 19, 1921 (Died)
	Joseph McKenna	Associate Justice	California	Stephen Johnson Field	January 21, 1898 (Acclamation)	January 26, 1898 – January 5, 1925 (Retired)
	Oliver Wendell Holmes Jr.	Associate Justice	Massachusetts	Horace Gray	December 4, 1902 (Acclamation)	December 8, 1902 – January 12, 1932 (Retired)
	William R. Day	Associate Justice	Ohio	George Shiras Jr.	February 23, 1903 (Acclamation)	March 2, 1903 – November 13, 1922 (Retired)
	Horace Harmon Lurton	Associate Justice	Tennessee	Rufus W. Peckham	December 20, 1909 (Acclamation)	January 3, 1910 – July 12, 1914 (Died)
	Charles Evans Hughes	Associate Justice	New York	David Josiah Brewer	May 2, 1910 (Acclamation)	October 10, 1910 – June 10, 1916 (Resigned)
	Willis Van Devanter	Associate Justice	Wyoming	Edward Douglass White (as Associate Justice)	December 15, 1910 (Acclamation)	January 3, 1911 – June 2, 1937 (Retired)
	Joseph Rucker Lamar	Associate Justice	Georgia	William Henry Moody	December 15, 1910 (Acclamation)	January 3, 1911 – January 2, 1916 (Died)

== Notable Case in 223 U.S. ==
=== Pacific States Tel. & Tel. Co. v. Oregon ===
Pacific States Tel. & Tel. Co. v. Oregon, 223 U.S. 118 (1912), involved the constitutionality of the citizens' initiative and the enforceability of the Guarantee Clause of the Constitution. A unanimous Supreme Court rejected a corporation's argument that the Guarantee Clause forbade Oregon's initiative process, citing Luther v. Borden to conclude that such claims presented political questions and are non-justiciable.

== Citation style ==
Under the Judiciary Act of 1789 the federal court structure at the time comprised District Courts, which had general trial jurisdiction; Circuit Courts, which had mixed trial and appellate (from the US District Courts) jurisdiction; and the United States Supreme Court, which had appellate jurisdiction over the federal District and Circuit courts—and for certain issues over state courts. The Supreme Court also had limited original jurisdiction (i.e., in which cases could be filed directly with the Supreme Court without first having been heard by a lower federal or state court). There were one or more federal District Courts and/or Circuit Courts in each state, territory, or other geographical region.

The Judiciary Act of 1891 created the United States Courts of Appeals and reassigned the jurisdiction of most routine appeals from the district and circuit courts to these appellate courts. The Act created nine new courts that were originally known as the "United States Circuit Courts of Appeals." The new courts had jurisdiction over most appeals of lower court decisions. The Supreme Court could review either legal issues that a court of appeals certified or decisions of court of appeals by writ of certiorari.

On January 1, 1912, the effective date of the Judicial Code of 1911, the old Circuit Courts were abolished, with their remaining trial court jurisdiction transferred to the U.S. District Courts.

Bluebook citation style is used for case names, citations, and jurisdictions.

- "# Cir." = United States Court of Appeals
  - e.g., "3d Cir." = United States Court of Appeals for the Third Circuit
- "C.C.D." = United States Circuit Court for the District of . . .
  - e.g.,"C.C.D.N.J." = United States Circuit Court for the District of New Jersey
- "D." = United States District Court for the District of . . .
  - e.g.,"D. Mass." = United States District Court for the District of Massachusetts
- "E." = Eastern; "M." = Middle; "N." = Northern; "S." = Southern; "W." = Western
  - e.g.,"C.C.S.D.N.Y." = United States Circuit Court for the Southern District of New York
  - e.g.,"M.D. Ala." = United States District Court for the Middle District of Alabama
- "Ct. Cl." = United States Court of Claims
- The abbreviation of a state's name alone indicates the highest appellate court in that state's judiciary at the time.
  - e.g.,"Pa." = Supreme Court of Pennsylvania
  - e.g.,"Me." = Supreme Judicial Court of Maine

== List of cases in volume 223 U.S. ==
Case Name	Page & year	Opinion of the Court	Concurring opinion(s)	Dissenting opinion(s)	Lower Court	Disposition
Second Employers' Liability Cases	1 (1912)	VanDevanter	none	none	multiple	multiple
Quong Wing v. Kirkendall	59 (1912)	Holmes	none	Lamar	Mont.	affirmed
Noble v. Gallardo y S.	65 (1912)	Holmes	none	none	D.P.R.	reversed
United States v. Wong You	67 (1912)	Holmes	none	none	2d Cir.	reversed
Louisville & N.R.R. Co. v. F.W. Cook B. Co.	70 (1912)	Lurton	none	none	7th Cir.	affirmed
Waskey v. Hammer	85 (1912)	VanDevanter	none	none	9th Cir.	affirmed
United States ex rel. Lowe v. Fisher	95 (1912)	McKenna	none	none	D.C. Cir.	affirmed
Cherokee Nation v. Whitmire	108 (1912)	McKenna	none	none	Ct. Cl.	reversed
Pacific et al. Co. v. Oregon	118 (1912)	White	none	none	Or.	dismissed
Kiernan v. City of Portland	151 (1912)	White	none	none	Or.	dismissed
The Abby Dodge	166 (1912)	White	none	none	S.D. Fla.	reversed
Hendricks v. United States	178 (1912)	White	none	none	C.C.D. Or.	dismissed
Aetna L. Ins. Co. v. Tremblay	185 (1912)	White	none	none	Me.	dismissed
United States v. Baruch	191 (1912)	White	none	none	2d Cir.	reversed
Jacobs v. Prichard	200 (1912)	McKenna	none	none	Wash.	affirmed
Fairbanks v. United States	215 (1912)	McKenna	none	none	8th Cir.	affirmed
United States et al. Co. v. Sandoval	227 (1912)	McKenna	none	none	Ariz.	reversed
Northwestern M.L. Ins. Co. v. McCue	234 (1912)	McKenna	none	none	4th Cir.	affirmed
New York C.J.F. Co. v. District of Columbia	253 (1912)	McKenna	none	none	D.D.C.	affirmed
Jacob v. Roberts	261 (1912)	McKenna	none	none	Cal.	affirmed
Ker & Co. v. Couden	268 (1912)	Holmes	none	McKenna	Phil.	affirmed
Atchison et al. R.R. Co. v. O'Connor	280 (1912)	Holmes	none	none	C.C.D. Colo.	reversed
Collins v. Texas	288 (1912)	Holmes	none	none	Tex. Crim. App.	affirmed
Meyer v. Wells Fargo & Co.	298 (1912)	Holmes	none	none	C.C.W.D. Okla.	affirmed
Powers v. United States	303 (1912)	Day	none	none	W.D. Va.	affirmed
Rocca v. Thompson	317 (1912)	Day	none	none	Cal.	affirmed
United States E. Co. v. Minnesota	335 (1912)	Day	none	none	Minn.	affirmed
Lincoln et al. Co. v. City of Lincoln	349 (1912)	Lurton	none	none	C.C.D. Neb.	reversed
The San Pedro	365 (1912)	Lurton	none	none	N.D. Cal.	reversed
Cuebas y A. v. Cuebas y A.	376 (1912)	Lurton	none	none	D.P.R.	affirmed
City of Cincinnati v. Louisville & N.R.R. Co.	390 (1912)	Lurton	none	none	Ohio	affirmed
United States v. Citroen	407 (1912)	Hughes	none	none	2d Cir.	affirmed
Ferris v. Frohman	424 (1912)	Hughes	none	none	Ill.	affirmed
Reitler v. Harris	437 (1912)	VanDevanter	none	none	Kan.	affirmed
Diaz v. United States	442 (1912)	VanDevanter	none	Lamar	Phil.	affirmed
Gaar S. & Co. v. Shannon	468 (1912)	Lamar	none	none	Tex. Civ. App.	affirmed
New M.E. Co. v. Marshall E. Co.	473 (1912)	Lamar	none	none	Mass. Super. Ct.	affirmed
Galveston et al. R.R. Co. v. Wallace	481 (1912)	Lamar	none	none	Tex. Civ. App.	affirmed
McCarthy v. First Nat'l Bank	493 (1912)	Lamar	none	none	S.D.	affirmed
Latimer v. United States	501 (1912)	Lamar	none	none	D.P.R.	affirmed
Miller v. King	505 (1912)	Lamar	none	none	Or.	affirmed
United States v. Nord D.L.	512 (1912)	Lamar	none	none	C.C.S.D.N.Y.	reversed
Metropolitan W. Co. v. Kaw V.D. Dist.	519 (1912)	Lamar	none	none	C.C.D. Kan.	dismissed
United States v. Ellicott	524 (1912)	White	none	none	Ct. Cl.	reversed
Ontario L. Co. v. Wilfong	543 (1912)	McKenna	none	none	9th Cir.	affirmed
Southern P.R.R. Co. v. United States	560 (1912)	Holmes	none	none	9th Cir.	affirmed
United States v. Southern P.R.R. Co.	565 (1912)	Holmes	none	none	9th Cir.	reversed
Kansas City S.R.R. Co. v. C.H. Albers Comm'n Co.	573 (1912)	VanDevanter	none	none	Kan.	reversed
United States v. Miller	599 (1912)	VanDevanter	none	none	C.C.S.D. Ga.	reversed
Philadelphia Co. v. Stimson	605 (1912)	Hughes	none	none	D.C. Cir.	affirmed
In re Merchant et al. Co.	639 (1912)	VanDevanter	none	none	8th Cir.	mandamus granted
Graham v. Gill	643 (1912)	White	none	none	Fla.	affirmed
Clason v. Matko	646 (1912)	McKenna	none	none	Ariz.	affirmed
Cedar Rapids G.L. Co. v. City of Cedar Rapids	655 (1912)	Holmes	none	none	Iowa	affirmed
Wingert v. First Nat'l Bank	670 (1912)	Holmes	none	none	4th Cir.	dismissed
Tang Tun v. Edsell	673 (1912)	Hughes	none	none	9th Cir.	affirmed
United States ex rel. Ness v. Fisher	683 (1912)	VanDevanter	none	none	D.C. Cir.	affirmed
Ripley v. United States	695 (1912)	Lamar	none	none	Ct. Cl.	affirmed
