= State Emigrant Refuge and Hospital =

Former New York State immigration complex

Coordinates: 40°47′18″N 73°55′48″W

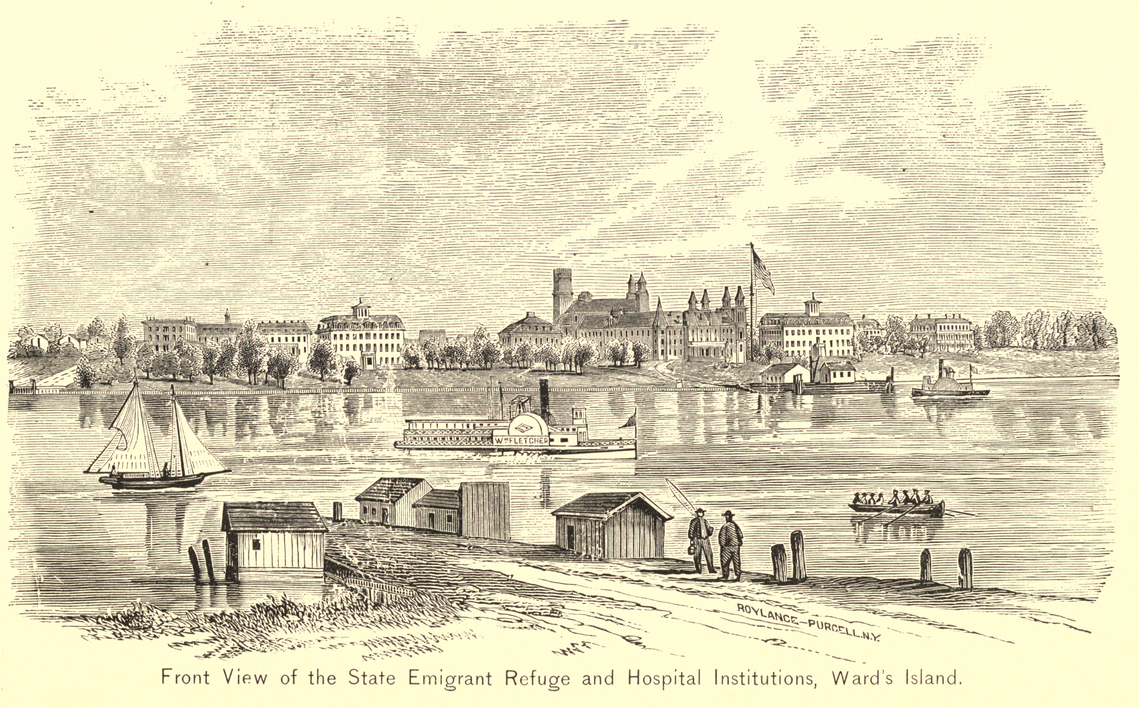
The State Emigrant Refuge and Hospital, seen from Manhattan circa 1870.

The State Emigrant Refuge and Hospital was a New York State immigration complex located on Wards Island in New York City. Established in 1847, it primarily consisted of a public shelter and a hospital, later known as the Verplanck State Emigrant Hospital, both of which served recent immigrant arrivals to the Port of New York. The complex was operated under the authority of the New York State Board of Commissioners of Emigration as part of a network of state-run immigration facilities, which included the State Emigrant Landing Depot at Castle Garden in Lower Manhattan. Recent immigrants to New York were entitled to services at the State Emigrant Refuge and Hospital for up to five years after their arrival.

In the 1850s, the State Emigrant Refuge and Hospital was the largest hospital complex in the world. It operated through the late nineteenth century, during a period of increased immigration to New York. The buildings of the complex were later taken over by the Manhattan State Hospital, and have since been demolished. The State Emigrant Refuge and Hospital should not be confused with the New York House of Refuge, a distinct institution that was located on Randalls Island.

== Background ==
Between 1770 and 1830, levels of immigration to the United States were relatively low. However, by the mid-1840s levels of annual immigration had begun to surge, driven largely by Irish and German arrivals. Increasingly, the arrival of such immigrants began to be concentrated in New York City. Indeed, immigrants would come to make up a substantial percentage of the city's population: in 1845 the foreign-born represented 37% of the city's total population, and by 1855 they had come to represent 51%. Many immigrants also passed through New York on their way to other destinations.

Initially, immigration to New York was only lightly regulated: there was no central processing station for new arrivals, who simply alighted onto the piers on which their ship had docked without any need for passport or visa. City and state services for immigrants were generally limited to almshouses and quarantine hospitals. Most support for new immigrants came from private Emigrant Aid Societies, such as the German Society of the City of New York. By the 1840s, however, this state of affairs began increasingly to be viewed as unsatisfactory. Increasing nativism, on the one hand, and a desire to better protect the welfare of immigrants, on the other hand, led to calls for greater oversight of immigration in New York. In May 1847, competing municipal and state interests led the New York State Legislature to establish the Board of Commissioners of Emigration.

Representing a "significant yet often overlooked" example of the nineteenth century struggle for power between city and state authority, the creation of the Board was backed by prominent figures such as Bishop John Hughes, publisher and politician Thurlow Weed, real estate magnate Andrew Carrigan, and lawyer John E. Develin. The Board consisted of ten members, six of whom were appointed by the Governor of New York and four of whom were ex-officio members (the Mayor of New York City, the Mayor of Brooklyn, the President of the Irish Emigrant Society of New York, and the President of the German Society of New York). The Board was tasked with the regulation of immigration and the protection of immigrants throughout the state. One of the Commissioners' highest priorities was the creation of an immigration processing center; however, realizing this goal proved elusive for several years. In 1855, the State Emigrant Landing Depot at Castle Garden was finally established in Manhattan. This became the first immigration station in the United States.

Another priority of the Board of Commissioners was the care of sick immigrants in order to check the spread of disease. Nativist sentiment against immigration was tied to a belief that immigrants were a vector for illness. The Commissioners assumed responsibility for the existing network of public health institutions serving immigrants, such as the Marine Hospital on Staten Island. However, these existing facilities faced severe opposition, later culminating in the Staten Island Quarantine War of 1858. There also remained the problem of caring for sick but non-contagious immigrants. The Commissioners of Emigration therefore turned to New York's minor islands to look for suitable sites to establish institutions to provide for the welfare of immigrants.

For this purpose, Bedloe's Island and Ellis Island were initially considered; however, Wards Island was eventually chosen. Wards Island is located to the east of Manhattan, at the confluence of the East River, the Harlem River, and the Bronx Kill. Now joined by land fill to Randalls Island and Sunken Meadow Island, Wards Island was originally nearly 240 acres (97 ha) in total land area. In the 1840s, it was considered remote from the City of New York. The island was privately owned; however, it had largely been abandoned after attempts at development in the 1820s. In the 1840s, typhus patients from Staten Island began to be received by a number of private hospitals established on the island, but these were very poorly maintained. The Commissioners of Emigration therefore moved to establish their own institution.

== History ==
On June 4, 1847, the State Board of Commissioners of Emigration leased land on Wards Island for the creation of the Emigrant Refuge and Hospital. This land had been privately purchased by the merchant Robert Minturn, then serving as one of the Commissioners. The Board would later purchase this and other land on Wards Island outright, eventually coming to own the entire shoreline of the island facing Manhattan. This was accomplished through several purchases from 1848 through 1868, with the State of New York ultimately owning 121 acres of land on the island (the rest eventually coming under the ownership of the City of New York).

The initial lease of land contained an abandoned stone factory building, which was quickly refurbished as the State Emigrant Refuge, a shelter for indigent immigrants. On July 14, 1847, the Board of Emigration ordered a new two-story dormitory to be built as an extension of the Refuge. In 1848 work was begun on a hospital for immigrants suffering from non-communicable diseases and other ailments; this was completed and opened on November 1, 1848. This first State Emigrant Hospital was built of wood and brick and could accommodate 250 beds. Subsequently, several other buildings, such as a nursery, were constructed. These new facilities were visited by Swedish writer and reformer Fredrika Bremer, during her tour of the United States, in 1849. By 1850, the State Emigrant Refuge and Hospital complex consisted of the refuge and hospital buildings, the nursery building, and twelve one-story wooden barracks built to accommodate patients, with the island having been connected to the Croton Aqueduct. This complex became so expansive that, according to historian John Duffy, "for a brief period, 1853-1855, the Ward’s Island hospital complex formed the largest hospital center in the world."

With the opening of the State Emigrant Landing Depot at Castle Garden in Lower Manhattan in 1855, the State Emigrant Refuge and Hospital became part of a complex New York State system of immigration regulation and immigrant welfare. Immigrants were first inspected for infectious diseases aboard their ships, anchored in The Narrows, before being landed at Castle Garden. There, immigrants were examined by doctors before they were processed. Those with serious medical conditions were sent by steamboat to Wards Island, where they would receive free treatment at the State Emigrant Hospital. Immigrants who passed through Castle Garden were allowed to apply for relief at the State Emigrant Refuge if they fell on hard times, for up to five years after their arrival. Within the administration of Castle Garden, Wards Island constituted its own department. The administration of Wards Island itself was divided into two departments; however, these departments were so intertwined that the Refuge and the Hospital represented one institution. The State Emigrant Refuge and Hospital were funded through the collection of commutation money, also called a "head tax", charged to the shipping companies for each passenger their ships landed in New York. This allowed immigrants to receive services on Wards Island for free, although those in the Refuge were expected to contribute to their upkeep by performing labor for the benefit of the institution. This all placed Wards Island as a crucial and integral part of the state immigration system, functioning closely with Castle Garden and the Staten Island Quarantine in managing the influx of immigrants and providing for their welfare.

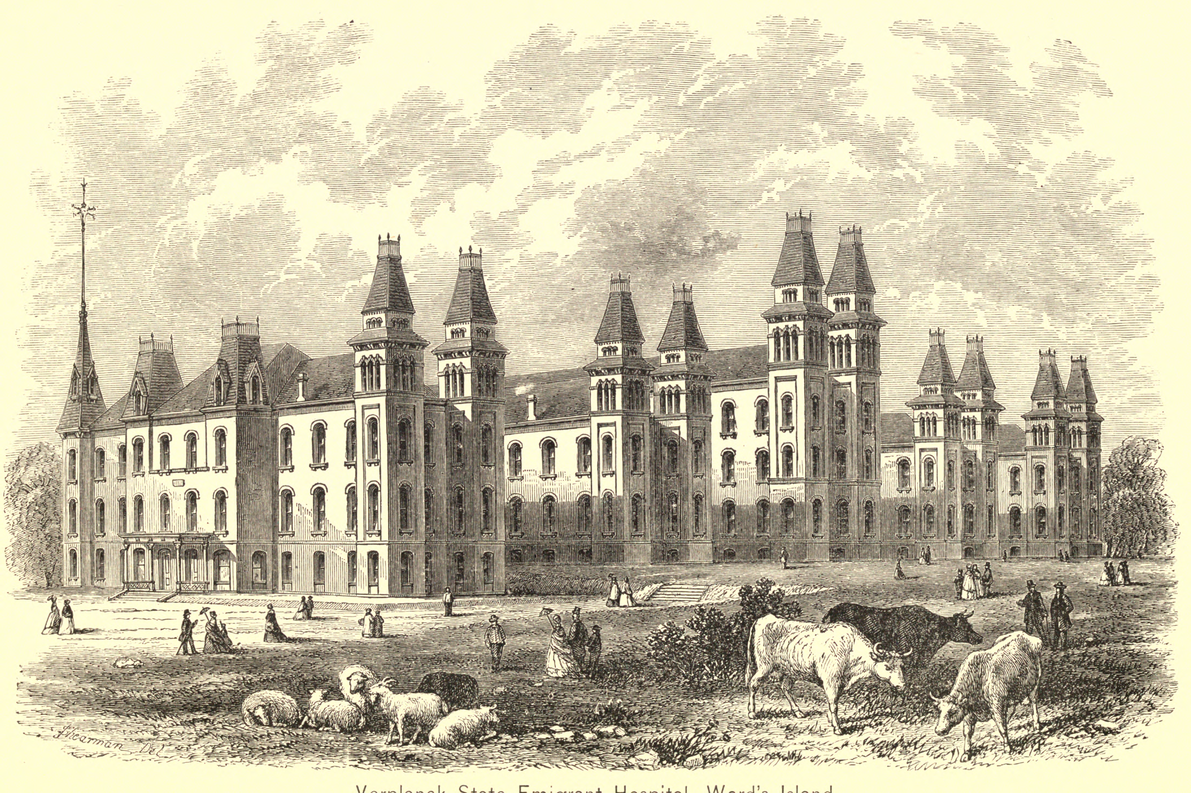
Verplanck State Emigrant Hospital, circa 1870.

With increasing levels of immigration during the 1850s there was increased demand at the State Emigrant Refuge and Hospital, putting increasing strain on the institutions. For instance, crowding on Wards Island led to a devastating outbreak of typhoid fever during the Winter of 1851-1852. Funding also proved a problem for the Board of Emigration after the U.S. Supreme Court's ruling in the Passenger Cases, and the Board also faced challenges in its operations from New York City Mayor Fernando Wood and from the Commissioners of Public Charities and Corrections, a city agency. By the 1860s, these problems and challenges had mostly been resolved, allowing the Board of Emigration to make improvements and expand operations on Wards Island. In August 1864, an "elaborate ceremony" was held to mark the laying of the cornerstone of a new hospital facility. This new hospital building, accommodating 350 patients, as well as a new refuge building that could accommodate 450 people, were officially opened on July 10, 1866. The plans for the new hospital had been met with approval by British social reformer Florence Nightingale. By 1870, the hospital had been renamed the Verplanck State Emigrant Hospital, after Commissioner Gulian C. Verplanck.

In 1870, the State Emigrant Refuge and Hospital complex consisted of the following buildings: the new hospital building (accommodating 350 patients), the Nursery (including Catholic chapel, seating 500), the Refuge building (chiefly for destitute women and children, accommodating 450), the New Barracks (for destitute men, accommodating 450), the Dispensary (accommodating 250 patients), the New Dining Hall (seating 1,200), four buildings of fever wards for men (accommodating 45 patients each), the fever ward building for women (accommodating 120 patients), the male surgical ward (accommodating 120 patients), the female medical ward (accommodating 45 patients; including Protestant chapel), the Boy's Barrack (accommodating 80), and the Lunatic Asylum (accommodating 125 patients; a separate institution from the city-run asylum also on Wards Island), as well as several residences for staff and other outlying buildings such as docks, stables, and the like. The immigration complex on Wards Island had also been connected by a direct telegraph line to Castle Garden. These expansions and improvements helped to increase the institutional capacity of the State Emigrant Refuge and Hospital to deal with the massive waves of immigration to New York. In the year 1870, 14,000 immigrants were admitted to Wards Island.

Not all immigrants were satisfied with the services provided by the State Emigrant Refuge and Hospital during this period. In Fall 1850, a scandal erupted after the bodies of two immigrant children were autopsied, something that many Irish Catholic immigrants objected to as contrary to their faith. Irish-American newspapers also criticized overcrowding and poor nutrition at the facilities. On February 28, 1870, approximately 300 immigrants rioted on Wards Island to demand an end to the labor requirement at the refuge.

The late 1860s to 1870 would prove to be the heyday of the State Emigrant Refuge and Hospital, its fortunes being closely tied to that of the State Board of Commissioners of Emigration. The Commissioners' decline began in 1870, when a reorganization of the board led to its capture by the Tammany Hall political machine. The Board was restored to its original organization in 1873; however, accusations of political patronage proved difficult to shake. A major setback occurred in 1876, when the Board was stripped of its ability to collect the head tax by the U.S. Supreme Court in Henderson v. Mayor of New York. This left the Commissioners dependent on emergency funding from New York State for their operations, with those at Wards Island curtailed. For instance, by 1881 it became necessary for the Commissioners to grant certain lands and facilities on Wards Island to be operated by the Hebrew Emigrant Aid Society. National dissatisfaction with New York State's control of the majority of immigration into the country also led to repeated calls for the Federalization of immigration. This was finally accomplished with the Immigration Act of 1882, which began national control of immigration into the U.S. by the United States Department of the Treasury. In New York, the State Commissioners of Emigration were contracted to continue their operations at Castle Garden and Wards Island under Federal mandate. There was, however, a notable decrease in the quality of their administration of New York's immigration system. Nevertheless, in this period the State Emigrant Hospital was responsible for one notable medical achievement: in 1888, it saw the first American use of an incubator.

The end of the State Emigrant Refuge and Hospital followed shortly after the end of the State Emigrant Landing Depot at Castle Garden. In the late 1880s, the Board of Commissioners of Emigration faced increased political opposition, such as from Grover Cleveland, first as Governor of New York and then as President of the United States. Conditions at Castle Garden especially were viewed as unsatisfactory, leading to political and journalistic protests. Finally, in 1890 a federal inquiry deemed Castle Garden to be inadequate and called for the creation of a federal immigration station in New York. This resulted in the establishment of the U.S. Immigration Station at Ellis Island in 1892. Additionally, the Immigration Act of 1891 ended the practice of contracting state agencies, such as New York's Commissioners of Emigration, for the administration of national immigration policy; instead, the federal government assumed direct control. This all spelled the end of the Commissioners of Emigration.

On Wards Island, the Commissioners' troubles had already resulted in the discharge of many employees at the State Emigrant Refuge and Hospital in 1889. With the opening of Ellis Island, responsibility for the care of sick immigrants was assumed by the Federal government and operations were moved from Wards Island to what became the Ellis Island Immigrant Hospital. The closure of the State Emigrant Refuge and Hospital was met with protests from some immigrant welfare groups. The buildings of the former immigration complex were subsequently taken over by the New York City Asylum for the Insane, which became Manhattan State Hospital in 1896 and is now known as the Manhattan Psychiatric Center. These buildings were demolished between the 1930s and the 1950s.

== Legacy ==
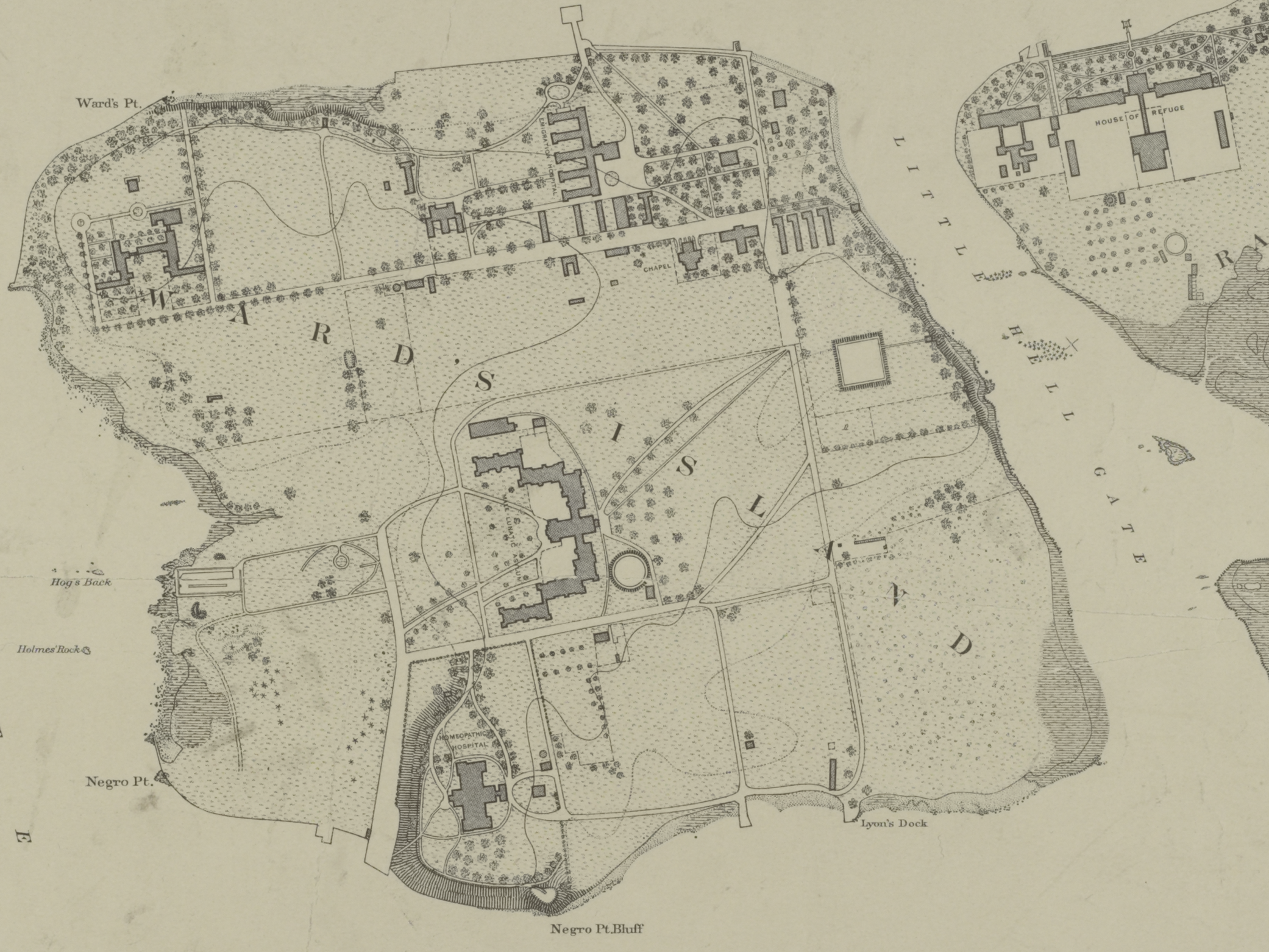
1885 Map of Wards Island. The buildings of the State Emigrant Refuge and Hospital are located on the top of the map.

The State Emigrant Refuge and Hospital is notable as an important part of New York's state run immigration regime. Before 1882, immigration was regulated by the several states. New York's system therefore represents an important transitional period from municipal oversight of immigration to modern federal immigration regulation and control. While some historians have found in New York's regime an important precursor to later exclusionary federal policy, others have interpreted in the program of the New York State Board of Commissioners of Emigration, of which the Wards Island institution was an integral part, a different vision towards immigration. For example, Brendan P. O'Malley has argued that Wards Island and Castle Garden represented "a modest welfare state" established for the benefit of new arrivals to New York. The State Emigrant Refuge and Hospital was established to aid and support immigrants who arrived in New York, especially those who were indigent or sick. It was part of a project to provide immigrants "with aid on their pathway to economic independence and citizenship". This was in contrast to the federal system introduced by the Immigration Act of 1882, which was predicated on exclusion through the creation of the "public charge rule" and which culminated in the Immigration Act of 1924. Some, such as O'Malley, have thus found in the New York State immigration regime a precedent for proposing alternatives to current American immigration law.

The State Emigrant Refuge and Hospital is also notable in American health history. In 1888, a baby incubator was used there for reportedly the first time in the United States. On September 7, 1888, baby Edith Eleanor McLean was born approximately 13 weeks prematurely to mother Agnes McLean of Glasgow, Scotland. The Superintendent of the State Emigrant Hospital, Dr. Allan M. Thomas, had previously read in a medical journal of the invention in France of the baby incubator by Étienne Stéphane Tarnier and had resolved to build a similar apparatus. This consisted of wooden box warmed by hot water and into which an infant could be placed, called by Thomas a "hatching cradle". After McLean's birth, the head of the lying-in ward, Dr. William C. Deming, requested the use of Thomas' device, which was quickly completed and put in to use. McLean was reared in this "hatching cradle" until she was judged strong enough to survive on her own, and she left the hospital on November 28, 1888. This claim as the first incubator in the United States has been widely repeated by popular sources.
