= Pacific States Telephone & Telegraph Co. v. Oregon =

- Supreme Court of the United States

Argued November 3, 1911 Decided February 19, 1912
- Full case name: Pacific States Telephone and Telegraph Company v. Oregon
- Citations: 223 U.S. 118 (more)

Holding
- Claims involving the Guarantee Clause constitute nonjusticiable political questions. Dismissed for want of jurisdiction.

Court membership
- Chief Justice Edward D. White Associate Justices Joseph McKenna · Oliver W. Holmes Jr. William R. Day · Horace H. Lurton; Charles E. Hughes · Willis Van Devanter; Joseph R. Lamar

Case opinion
- Majority: White, joined by unanimous

Laws applied
- Article IV, Section 4 of the U.S. Constitution

Pacific States Telephone & Telegraph Co. v. Oregon, 223 U.S. 118 (1912), was a decision of the Supreme Court of the United States involving the constitutionality of the citizens' initiative and the enforceability of the Guarantee Clause of the Constitution. In an opinion authored by Chief Justice Edward Douglass White, a unanimous Court rejected a corporation's argument that the Guarantee Clause forbade Oregon's initiative process, citing Luther v. Borden to conclude that such claims presented political questions and thus were non-justiciable.

== Background ==
Article IV, Section 4 of the U.S. Constitution states that "[t]he United States shall guarantee to every State in this Union a Republican Form of Government...". The precise meaning of this clause remains uncertain because the Supreme Court has chosen not to apply it directly. In Luther v. Borden (1849), the Court was asked to decide which of two political factions in Rhode Island was the legitimate government of that state. The justices held that they lacked jurisdiction, ruling that the question of whether a state had a republican form of government was a political question that only Congress had the power to decide. At the time of the Pacific States decision, a line of precedent stemming from Luther had held that disputes about the Guarantee Clause were outside the scope of the Court's authority.

During the early part of the twentieth century, the political movement known as Progressivism swept the nation. Reformers strove against poverty, poor working conditions, and what they viewed as an excess of corporate power over the political system. They supported efforts that would give power directly to the electorate: the initiative, by which voters could propose and enact legislation directly, and the referendum, by which citizens could vote to reject laws already passed by the legislature. According to Progressives, such reforms would institute a modicum of direct democracy, allowing voters to sidestep a corrupt political process. By contrast, corporations, which often were the target of laws passed by initiative, opposed such reforms.

A 1902 constitutional amendment in Oregon adopted both the initiative and the referendum in that state. By a nearly ten-to-one margin in 1906, voters imposed via initiative a two-percent tax on telephone and telegraph companies' revenues. The Pacific States Telephone and Telegraph Company refused to pay it, and the state sued to collect the tax. In court, the corporation argued, among other things, that because the initiative constituted direct democracy, it was contrary to the representative system that was integral to the republican form of government required by the Constitution. After Oregon's state courts ruled the tax valid, the company appealed to the U.S. Supreme Court, making the sole argument that the initiative violated the Guarantee Clause.

== Decision ==
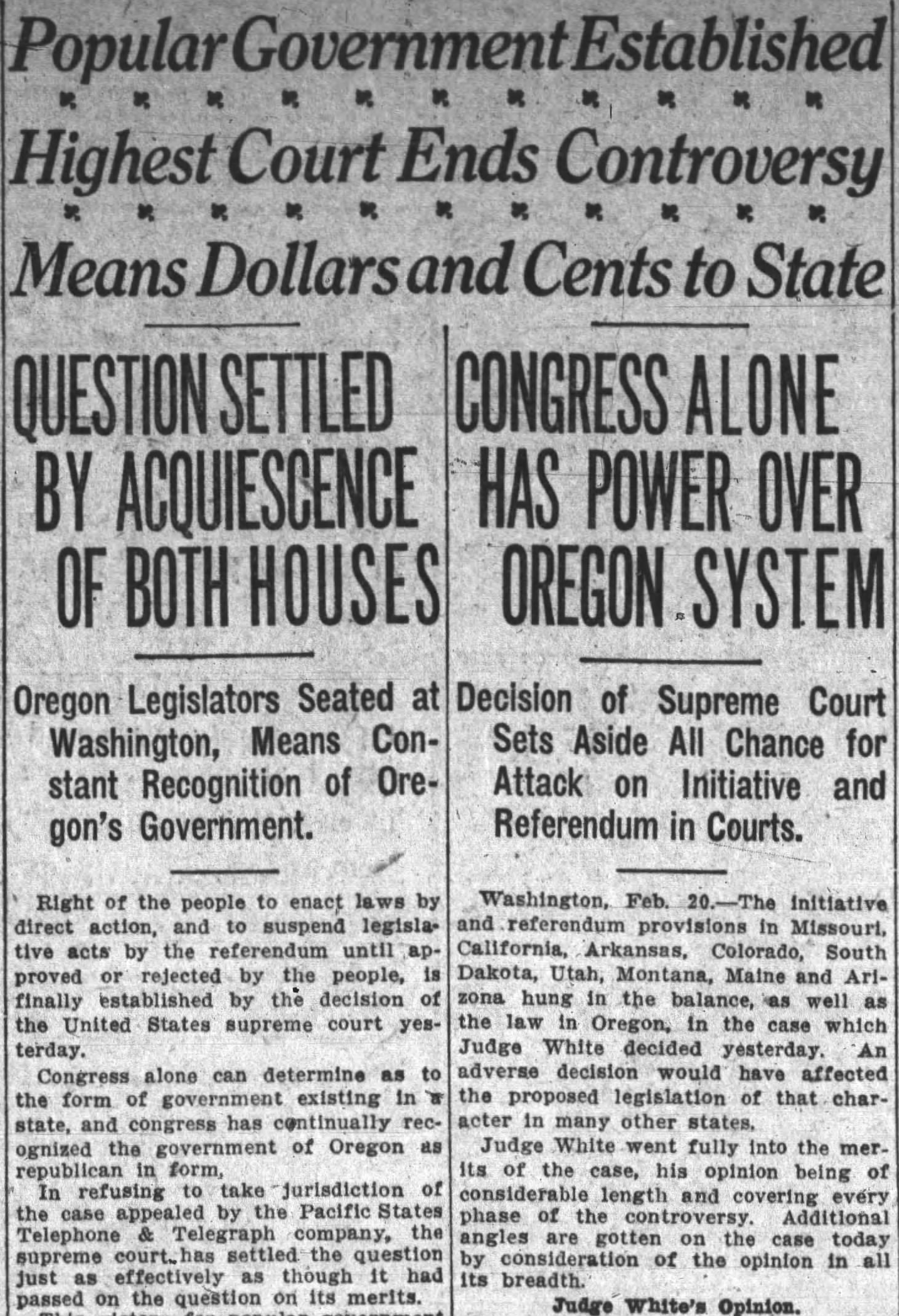
These headlines from the Oregon Daily Journal, dated February 20, 1912, announce the Supreme Court's decision in Pacific States.

The justices rendered their decision on February 19, 1912. Chief Justice Edward Douglass White delivered the opinion for a unanimous Court, ruling that the case presented a political question that fell outside of the Court's jurisdiction. White expressed fear that a ruling in the company's favor would encroach upon states' rights, writing that such a decision would require the "inconceivable expansion of the judicial power and the ruinous destruction of legislative authority in matters purely political". He quoted repeatedly from the Court's decision in Luther and determined it to be "absolutely controlling". White ruled that only Congress had the authority to enforce the Guarantee Clause. He found it obvious that the dispute presented a political question because the state government had been "called to the bar of this court, not for the purpose of testing judicially some exercise of power...but to demand of the State that it establish its right to exist as a State, republican in form". White commented that the company might have had a better chance of succeeding if it had challenged the tax itself rather than the process by which it was enacted. But since the Guarantee Clause arguments had an "essentially political character", the Court dismissed the case for lack of jurisdiction.

== Legacy ==
Pacific States had the practical effect of giving the Court's imprimatur to initiatives and referendums at the state and local levels. By reaffirming Luther, it also sent a strong signal that the Court had no interest in deciding cases involving the Guarantee Clause. In a 1999 book about the White Court, the legal historian Walter F. Pratt wrote that the decision in Pacific States "implied that the Court was willing to permit experiments with different procedures in state governments". The legal scholar William M. Wiecek argued in 1972 that, while the outcome of the case "was defensible", the Chief Justice's "loose and extravagant language" supported "a constitutional doctrine of judicial abstention" that went well beyond what was necessary to decide the case. The decision in Pacific States served as an influential precedent: in the years after the case was decided, the courts relied heavily on it to dispose of challenges to various state laws. The decision has been understood to bar all suits that claim that a given law is at odds with a republican form of government.
