= Robert Louis Hoguet =

American banker

Robert Louis Hoguet (1878–1961) was a banker, lawyer and civic leader in New York City.

== Career ==
Hoguet received his AB from Harvard College (1899) and his L.L.B. from Harvard Law School (1902). After working in the law for two decades, he became a first vice president of the Emigrant Bank in 1923, and became president in 1936. From 1945 to 1946 he served on the bank's board. The Emigrant Bank was founded to provide Irish immigrants in New York with a safe place for their money. He left Emigrant in 1946 and joined the law firm Amend and Amend. He also served as vice president and director of Arthur Seligman and Co., Inc., and president of the Hoguet Real Estate Corporation.

== Philanthropic Organizations ==
Hoguet led or served on the boards of numerous philanthropic organizations over the course of his life, with particular interest in children, the poor, immigrant communities, post-war relief, and the Catholic faith.

- St. Vincent de Paul Institute, Tarrytown NY, President and Trustee
- New York Catholic Protectory, board
- Children's Aid Society, Director and Trustee
- French Institute, Director and Treasurer
- Lincoln Hall, Catholic Charities of New York, President of the board of managers
- Boy Scout Foundation of Greater New York, Council Member
- Girl Scouts, national advisory group
- American Re-lief to Austria, Inc., founding president (1945)
- Cooperative for American Remittances Everywhere (CARE), official
- Common Council for American Unity, chairman of campaign committee (appointed 1953)

=== Catholic Causes ===
Hoguet and his wife, Louise, were deeply involved in the Catholic Church and were important advocates for numerous Catholic causes. They are recognized as essential to the effort to bring the Carthusian Order to the United States. They were granted a private audience with Pope Pius XII at the Vatican in order to propose this action, and met with Carthusian entities in Italy to discuss the prospect. Louise Hoguet found a donor to donate a property in Vermont for the Order's use.

== Personal life ==
Hoguet was born into a prominent New York Irish Catholic family. His grandfather, Henry L. Hoguet, emigrated to New York from Ireland in 1834, to work for his family's fur business. He was on the board of the Emigrant Bank and served on numerous charities, a practice that was to be followed by later generations.
