= List of United States Supreme Court cases, volume 48 =

Supreme Court of the United States
- Interactive map of Supreme Court of the United States
- 38°53′26″N 77°00′16″W
- Established: March 4, 1789; 236 years ago
- Location: Washington, D.C.
- Coordinates: 38°53′26″N 77°00′16″W
- Composition method: Presidential nomination with Senate confirmation
- Authorised by: Constitution of the United States, Art. III, § 1
- Judge term length: Life tenure, subject to impeachment and removal
- Number of positions: 9 (by statute)
- Website: supremecourt.gov

This is a list of cases reported in volume 48 (7 How.) of United States Reports, decided by the Supreme Court of the United States in 1848 and 1849.

== Nominative reports ==
In 1874, the U.S. government created the United States Reports, and retroactively numbered older privately-published case reports as part of the new series. As a result, cases appearing in volumes 1–90 of U.S. Reports have dual citation forms; one for the volume number of U.S. Reports, and one for the volume number of the reports named for the relevant reporter of decisions (these are called "nominative reports").

=== Benjamin Chew Howard ===
Starting with the 42nd volume of U.S. Reports, the Reporter of Decisions of the Supreme Court of the United States was Benjamin Chew Howard. Howard was Reporter of Decisions from 1843 to 1860, covering volumes 42 through 65 of United States Reports which correspond to volumes 1 through 24 of his Howard's Reports. As such, the dual form of citation to, for example, United States v. City of Chicago is 48 U.S. (7 How.) 185 (1849).

== Justices of the Supreme Court at the time of 48 U.S. (7 How.) ==
The Supreme Court is established by Article III, Section 1 of the Constitution of the United States, which says: "The judicial Power of the United States, shall be vested in one supreme Court . . .". The size of the Court is not specified; the Constitution leaves it to Congress to set the number of justices. Under the Judiciary Act of 1789 Congress originally fixed the number of justices at six (one chief justice and five associate justices). Since 1789 Congress has varied the size of the Court from six to seven, nine, ten, and back to nine justices (always including one chief justice).

When the cases in 48 U.S. (7 How.) were decided the Court comprised these nine members:

Portrait	Justice	Office	Home State	Succeeded	Date confirmed by the Senate (Vote)	Tenure on Supreme Court
	Roger B. Taney	Chief Justice	Maryland	John Marshall	March 15, 1836 (29–15)	March 28, 1836 – October 12, 1864 (Died)
	John McLean	Associate Justice	Ohio	Robert Trimble	March 7, 1829 (Acclamation)	January 11, 1830 – April 4, 1861 (Died)
	James Moore Wayne	Associate Justice	Georgia	William Johnson	January 9, 1835 (Acclamation)	January 14, 1835 – July 5, 1867 (Died)
	John Catron	Associate Justice	Tennessee	newly created seat	March 8, 1837 (28–15)	May 1, 1837 – May 30, 1865 (Died)
	John McKinley	Associate Justice	Alabama	newly created seat	September 25, 1837 (Acclamation)	January 9, 1838 – July 19, 1852 (Died)
	Peter Vivian Daniel	Associate Justice	Virginia	Philip P. Barbour	March 2, 1841 (25–5)	January 10, 1842 – May 31, 1860 (Died)
	Samuel Nelson	Associate Justice	New York	Smith Thompson	February 14, 1845 (Acclamation)	February 27, 1845 – November 28, 1872 (Retired)
	Levi Woodbury	Associate Justice	New Hampshire	Joseph Story	January 31, 1846 (Acclamation)	September 23, 1845 – September 4, 1851 (Died)
	Robert Cooper Grier	Associate Justice	Pennsylvania	Henry Baldwin	August 4, 1846 (Acclamation)	August 10, 1846 – January 31, 1870 (Retired)

== Notable cases in 48 U.S. (7 How.) ==
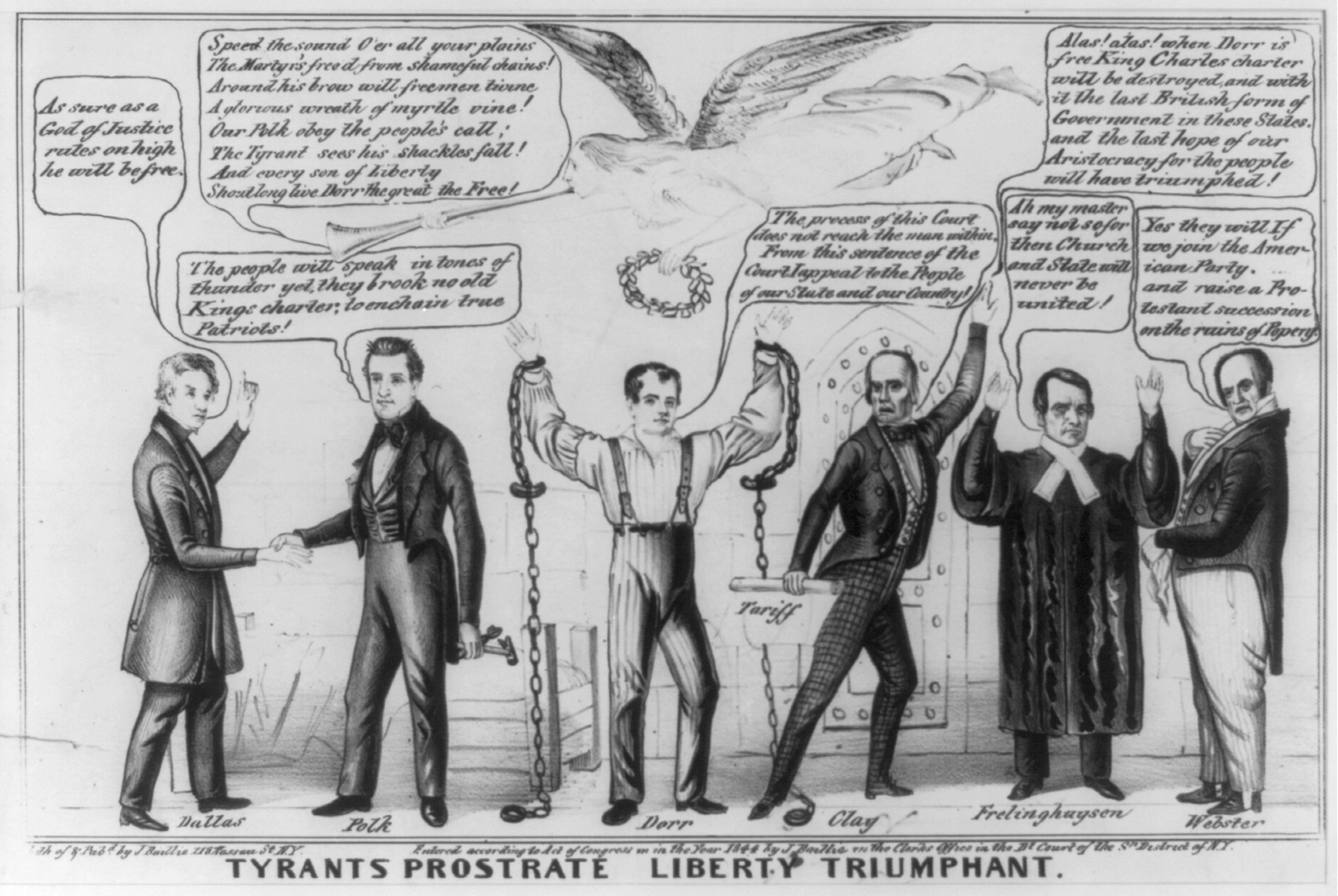
Polemic supporting Dorrite cause

=== Luther v. Borden ===
In Luther v. Borden, 48 U.S. (7 How.) 1 (1849), the Supreme Court established the political question doctrine in controversies arising under the Guarantee Clause of Article Four of the United States Constitution (Art. IV, § 4). The holding that the "republican form of government" clause of Article Four is non-justiciable still stands today. The case arose from the Dorr Rebellion in Rhode Island.

=== Passenger Cases ===
Smith v. Turner, and Norris v. Boston, 48 U.S. (7 How.) 283 (1849), are two similar cases, argued together before the Supreme Court, which decided 5-4 that states do not have the right to impose a tax determined by the number of passengers of a designated category on board a ship and/or disembarking into the State. Together, the cases are sometimes termed the Passenger Cases. The Court did not produce a majority opinion. Eight Justices authored separate opinions, totalling hundreds of pages, and their respective stances on various issues did not always align with other justices in their concurrences or dissents. The Passengers Cases are of historical interest. They portray diverse views on several constitutional questions, especially whether the Commerce Clause prohibits any state regulation of interstate and foreign commerce in the absence of federal law or treaty. The failure of the Court to produce a majority opinion significantly diminished the value of the Passengers Cases as a precedent.

== Citation style ==
Under the Judiciary Act of 1789 the federal court structure at the time comprised District Courts, which had general trial jurisdiction; Circuit Courts, which had mixed trial and appellate (from the US District Courts) jurisdiction; and the United States Supreme Court, which had appellate jurisdiction over the federal District and Circuit courts—and for certain issues over state courts. The Supreme Court also had limited original jurisdiction (i.e., in which cases could be filed directly with the Supreme Court without first having been heard by a lower federal or state court). There were one or more federal District Courts and/or Circuit Courts in each state, territory, or other geographical region.

Bluebook citation style is used for case names, citations, and jurisdictions.

- "C.C.D." = United States Circuit Court for the District of . . .
  - e.g.,"C.C.D.N.J." = United States Circuit Court for the District of New Jersey
- "D." = United States District Court for the District of . . .
  - e.g.,"D. Mass." = United States District Court for the District of Massachusetts
- "E." = Eastern; "M." = Middle; "N." = Northern; "S." = Southern; "W." = Western
  - e.g.,"C.C.S.D.N.Y." = United States Circuit Court for the Southern District of New York
  - e.g.,"M.D. Ala." = United States District Court for the Middle District of Alabama
- "Ct. Cl." = United States Court of Claims
- The abbreviation of a state's name alone indicates the highest appellate court in that state's judiciary at the time.
  - e.g.,"Pa." = Supreme Court of Pennsylvania
  - e.g.,"Me." = Supreme Judicial Court of Maine

== List of cases in 48 U.S. (7 How.) ==
Case Name	Page & year	Opinion of the Court	Concurring opinion(s)	Dissenting opinion(s)	Lower Court	Disposition
Luther v. Borden	1 (1849)	Taney	none	Woodbury	C.C.D.R.I.	affirmed
Wilkes v. Dinsman	89 (1849)	Woodbury	none	none	C.C.D.C.	reversed
Patton v. Taylor	132 (1849)	Nelson	none	none	C.C.D. Ky.	reversed
Fourniquet v. Perkins	160 (1849)	Daniel	none	none	C.C.D. La.	affirmed
Erwin v. Lowry	172 (1849)	Catron	none	none	La.	reversed
United States v. City of Chicago	185 (1849)	Woodbury	none	Catron	C.C.D. Ill.	certification
Smith v. Kernochen	198 (1849)	Nelson	none	none	C.C.S.D. Ala.	reversed
McLaughlin v. Bank of Potomac	220 (1849)	Woodbury	none	none	C.C.D.C.	affirmed
Wagner v. Baird	234 (1849)	Grier	none	none	C.C.D. Ohio	affirmed
Matheson v. Bank of Ala.	260 (1849)	Taney	none	none	Ala.	dismissed
McArthur's Heirs v. Dun's Heirs	262 (1849)	Daniel	none	none	C.C.D. Ohio	certification
Mace v. Wells	272 (1848)	McLean	none	none	Vt.	reversed
Bodley v. Goodrich	276 (1849)	McLean	none	none	C.C.D. La.	affirmed
Crawford v. Bank of Ala.	279 (1849)	McLean	none	none	Ala.	dismissed
Passenger Cases	283 (1849)	none	all	all	multiple	reversed
Tyler v. Hand	573 (1849)	Wayne	none	none	N.D. Miss.	reversed
Kennedy's Ex'rs v. Hunt's Lessee	586 (1848)	Catron	none	none	Ala.	dismissed
Hugg v. Augusta Ins. & Banking Co.	595 (1849)	Nelson	none	none	C.C.D. Md.	certification
Peck v. Jenness	612 (1849)	Grier	none	none	N.H.	affirmed
Colby v. Ledden	626 (1849)	Grier	none	none	N.H.	affirmed
Shawhan v. Wherritt	627 (1849)	Grier	none	none	C.C.D. Ky.	affirmed
Sadler v. Hoover	646 (1849)	Taney	none	none	C.C.S.D. Miss.	certification
Barnard v. Gibson	650 (1849)	McLean	none	none	C.C.N.D.N.Y.	dismissed
United States v. Boisdore's Heirs	658 (1849)	McLean	none	none	S.D. Miss.	dismissal denied
Missouri v. Iowa	660 (1849)	Catron	none	none	original	boundary set
Jones v. United States	681 (1849)	Daniel	none	none	C.C.E.D. Va.	affirmed
Harris v. Wall	693 (1849)	Grier	none	none	C.C.S.D. Miss.	reversed
Townsend v. Jemison	706 (1849)	Woodbury	Taney	Daniel	N.D. Miss.	affirmed
Hardeman v. Harris	726 (1849)	Taney	none	none	C.C.S.D. Miss.	certification
Cutler v. Rae	729 (1849)	Taney	Wayne	none	C.C.D. Mass.	reversed
Smith v. Hunter	738 (1849)	Daniel	none	none	Ohio	dismissed
McDonald v. Hobson	745 (1849)	Nelson	none	none	C.C.D. Ohio	reversed
Massingill v. Downs	760 (1849)	McLean	none	none	C.C.S.D. Miss.	certification
Udell v. Davidson	769 (1849)	Taney	none	none	Ill.	dismissed
Neilson v. Lagow	772 (1849)	Taney	none	none	Ind.	dismissal denied
Lewis ex rel. Longworth v. Lewis	776 (1849)	Taney	none	McLean	C.C.D. Ill.	certification
van Rensselaer v. Watt's Ex'rs	784 (1849)	Taney	none	none	not indicated	docketing denied
Lawrence v. Allen	785 (1849)	Woodbury	none	none	C.C.S.D.N.Y.	reversed
Backus v. Gould	798 (1849)	McLean	none	none	C.C.N.D.N.Y.	reversed
Nesmith v. Sheldon	812 (1849)	Taney	none	none	C.C.D. Mich.	certification
Stearns v. Page	819 (1849)	Grier	none	none	C.C.D. Me.	affirmed
United States v. King	833 (1849)	Taney	none	McLean, Wayne	C.C.E.D. La.	reversed

== See also ==
- Certificate of division
