= Head Money Cases =

- Supreme Court of the United States

Argued November 19–20, 1884 Decided December 8, 1884
- Full case name: Edye and Another v. Robertson, Collector; Cunard Steamship Company v. Robertson; Same v. Same
- Citations: 112 U.S. 580 (more) 5 S. Ct. 247; 28 L. Ed. 798; 1884 U.S. LEXIS 1909; 3 A.F.T.R. (P-H) 2473

Case history
- Prior: On writs of error from the Circuit Courts of the Eastern and Southern Districts of New York

Holding
- Treaties do not hold a privileged position above other acts of Congress, and other laws affecting their "enforcement, modification, or repeal" are legitimate.

Court membership
- Chief Justice Morrison Waite Associate Justices Samuel F. Miller · Stephen J. Field; Joseph P. Bradley · John M. Harlan; William B. Woods · Stanley Matthews; Horace Gray · Samuel Blatchford

Case opinion
- Majority: Miller, joined unanimously

Laws applied
- U.S. Const.

The Head Money Cases, 112 U.S. 580 (1884), also referred to as Edye v. Robertson, were a group of cases decided together by the United States Supreme Court.

== Background ==
Pursuant to the Immigration Act of 1882, officers from the customhouse in the Port of New York began collecting a tax from ships of fifty cents for each immigrant aboard. Multiple ship owners sued because they were transporting Dutch immigrants, and the Netherlands had a treaty with the United States that seemed to prohibit the tax.

== Decision ==
The case established the precedent that treaties, which are described in the Supremacy Clause of the US Constitution as "the supreme law of the land" equal to any domestic federal law, do not hold a privileged position above other acts of Congress. Hence, other laws affecting the "enforcement, modification, or repeal" of treaties are legitimate.

== See also ==
- Passenger Cases: A similar case covering a head tax on British immigrants.
- Henderson v. Mayor of New York
- List of United States Supreme Court cases, volume 112
