= John E. Develin =

American lawyer and politician

John Edward Develin (August 31, 1820 – February 23, 1888) was an American lawyer and politician from New York City.

== Life ==
Develin was born on August 31, 1820, in Yonkers, New York, the son of John Develin and Deborah Ireland. His father was an Irish immigrant.

Develin moved to New York City with his family when he was four. He attended a Grammar School on Murray Street run by Principal Charles H. Anthony. In 1836, he began attending Georgetown College in Washington, D.C. He graduated from there first in his class in 1840. He then returned to New York City, where he began studying law under Jonathan Miller and was admitted to the bar in 1844. He later became Miller's law partner until Miller's death. In 1845, he was elected to the New York State Assembly. He served on the Assembly in 1846 and 1847, during which time he sought to pass laws to aid and protect emigrants, which led to the creation of the Board of Commissioners of Emigration. He also secured an act of incorporation for St. John's College in Fordham.

In 1848, Develin was a delegate to the Free Soil Party state convention and was that party's candidate for the Assembly in the New York County 7th District. In 1850, Governor Hamilton Fish appointed him a Commissioner of Emigration to succeed the retiring Andrew Carrigan. When he retired as Commissioner he was made Counsel of the Board of Commissioners. His legal career was especially interested in emigration. A Democrat all his life, during the American Civil War he was a War Democrat. In 1862, he was elected Corporation Counsel of New York City. He held that office until 1866. In that year, he was elected to the New York State Assembly, representing the New York County 19th District. He served in the Assembly in 1867. By then, he lived near Manhattanville.

Develin was a delegate to the 1867-1868 New York State Constitutional Convention. During the 1868 Democratic National Convention in New York City, he was seriously injured while driving a barouche in Central Park in an accident that killed Albany lawyer and politician Peter Cagger, who was in the barouche with Develin. A strong opponent of the Tweed Ring, he left Tammany Hall when John Kelly struck a blow against Lucius Robinson. He was a delegate to the 1880 Democratic National Convention and used his influence to exclude Kelly from the Convention. He initially supported Henry B. Payne at the Convention, but by the end he supported Winfield Scott Hancock.

A devout Catholic, Develin was involved with the Foundling Asylum, St. Vincent's Hospital, the Sisters of Charity, New York Catholic Protectory, and nearly every other major Catholic charity in the city. He was also secretary of the Irish Famine Relief Association, and when Charles Stewart Parnell came to New York City in 1880 he was appointed to welcome him. He was married to the daughter of Charles Stetson, the proprietor of the Astor House. They had three daughters (one of whom was Mrs. William B. Knapp) and a son Charles S.

Develin died from kidney failure at his home in Washington Heights on February 23, 1888. His funeral at the Church of the Annunciation was attended by various politicians, lawyers, and judges, including Recorder Frederick Smyth, Senator Eugene S. Ives, ex-Assistant United States Treasurer Thomas C. Acton, Frederic Coudert, ex-Mayor William Russell Grace, and members of various Democratic organizations. The president, vice-president, and 250 students of Manhattan College also attended. Rev. J. J. Griffin of the Church of the Annunciation, Rev. Michael J. Lavelle of St. Patrick's Cathedral, Father John J. Gallagher, and Father John M. Grady of Port Chester helped conduct the service. The funeral was also attended by Samuel D. Babcock, ex-Mayor Edward Cooper, Archbishop of New York Michael Corrigan, Joseph H. Choate, Corporation Counsel Henry R. Beekman, and the Board of Managers of the New York Catholic Protectory and the Catholic Orphan Asylum. He was buried in Calvary Cemetery.

New York State Assembly
Preceded by District Created	New York State Assembly; New York County, 19th District; 1867	Succeeded by William L. Wiley
