= Elk v. Wilkins =

- Supreme Court of the United States

Argued April 28, 1884 Decided November 3, 1884
- Full case name: John Elk v. Charles Wilkins
- Citations: 112 U.S. 94 (more) 5 S. Ct. 41; 28 L. Ed. 643; 1884 U.S. LEXIS 1857

Holding
- An Indian cannot make himself a citizen of the United States without the consent and the co-operation of the government.

Court membership
- Chief Justice Morrison Waite Associate Justices Samuel F. Miller · Stephen J. Field; Joseph P. Bradley · John M. Harlan; William B. Woods · Stanley Matthews; Horace Gray · Samuel Blatchford

Case opinions
- Majority: Gray, joined by Waite, Miller, Field, Bradley, Matthews, Blatchford
- Dissent: Harlan, joined by Woods

Elk v. Wilkins, 112 U.S. 94 (1884), is a landmark decision of the Supreme Court of the United States that held that Native Americans born on Indian reservations were not entitled to birthright citizenship under the Citizenship Clause of the Fourteenth Amendment to the United States Constitution.

John Elk, a Winnebago Native American, was born on an Indian reservation within the territorial bounds of United States. He later resided off-reservation in Omaha, Nebraska, where he renounced his former tribal allegiance and claimed birthright citizenship by virtue of the Citizenship Clause of the Fourteenth Amendment. The case came about after Elk tried to register to vote on April 5, 1880, and was denied by Charles Wilkins, the named defendant, who was registrar of voters of the Fifth ward of the City of Omaha.

In a 7–2 decision, the Supreme Court ruled that even though Elk was born in the United States, he was not a citizen because he was not subject to the jurisdiction of the United States when he was born on an Indian reservation. The United States Congress later enacted the Indian Citizenship Act of 1924, which established citizenship for Native Americans previously excluded by the Constitution.

== Background ==
The question then was whether a Native American born a member of one of the Indian(Native American) tribes within the United States is, merely by reason of his birth within the United States and of his afterward voluntarily separating himself from the tribe and taking up residence among white citizens, a citizen of the United States within the meaning of the first section of the Fourteenth Amendment of the Constitution.

Under the Constitution, Congress had and exercised the power to regulate commerce with the Indian tribes, and the members thereof, within or without the boundaries of one of the states of the Union. The "Indian tribes, being within the territorial limits of the United States, were not, strictly speaking, foreign states"; but "they were alien nations, distinct political communities", with whom the United States dealt with through treaties and acts of Congress. The members of those tribes owed immediate allegiance to their several tribes, and were not part of the people of the United States.

== Decision ==
While Elk was born within the United States, he was born as a subject of a Native American nation within the sovereign jurisdiction of a Native reservation. The Court held Elk was not "subject to the jurisdiction" of the United States at birth.

== Legacy ==
In a dissent in United States v. Wong Kim Ark, Justice Melville Fuller quoted this opinion, "The evident meaning of these last words is, not merely subject in some respect or degree to the jurisdiction of the United States, but completely subject to their political jurisdiction, and owing them direct and immediate allegiance." In March 2026, solicitor general D. John Sauer cited Elk v. Wilkins in Trump v. Barbara to argue in favor of Executive Order 14160, which would end birthright citizenship for the children of parents without U.S. citizenship or permanent residency .

=== Subsequent legislation ===
The exclusion of Native Americans from citizenship was eventually eliminated by the Indian Citizenship Act of 1924. At the time, two thirds of Native Americans had already achieved citizenship.

== See also ==
- List of United States Supreme Court cases, volume 112
- Standing Bear v. Crook
- United States nationality law
