= List of United States Supreme Court cases, volume 112 =

Supreme Court of the United States
- Interactive map of Supreme Court of the United States
- 38°53′26″N 77°00′16″W
- Established: March 4, 1789; 236 years ago
- Location: Washington, D.C.
- Coordinates: 38°53′26″N 77°00′16″W
- Composition method: Presidential nomination with Senate confirmation
- Authorised by: Constitution of the United States, Art. III, § 1
- Judge term length: life tenure, subject to impeachment and removal
- Number of positions: 9 (by statute)
- Website: supremecourt.gov

This is a list of cases reported in volume 112 of United States Reports, decided by the Supreme Court of the United States in 1884 and 1885.

== Justices of the Supreme Court at the time of volume 112 U.S. ==
The Supreme Court is established by Article III, Section 1 of the Constitution of the United States, which says: "The judicial Power of the United States, shall be vested in one supreme Court . . .". The size of the Court is not specified; the Constitution leaves it to Congress to set the number of justices. Under the Judiciary Act of 1789 Congress originally fixed the number of justices at six (one chief justice and five associate justices). Since 1789 Congress has varied the size of the Court from six to seven, nine, ten, and back to nine justices (always including one chief justice).

When the cases in volume 112 U.S. were decided the Court comprised the following nine members:

Portrait	Justice	Office	Home State	Succeeded	Date confirmed by the Senate (Vote)	Tenure on Supreme Court
	Morrison Waite	Chief Justice	Ohio	Salmon P. Chase	January 21, 1874 (63–0)	March 4, 1874 – March 23, 1888 (Died)
	Samuel Freeman Miller	Associate Justice	Iowa	Peter Vivian Daniel	July 16, 1862 (Acclamation)	July 21, 1862 – October 13, 1890 (Died)
	Stephen Johnson Field	Associate Justice	California	newly created seat	March 10, 1863 (Acclamation)	May 10, 1863 – December 1, 1897 (Retired)
	Joseph P. Bradley	Associate Justice	New Jersey	newly created seat	March 21, 1870 (46–9)	March 23, 1870 – January 22, 1892 (Died)
	John Marshall Harlan	Associate Justice	Kentucky	David Davis	November 29, 1877 (Acclamation)	December 10, 1877 – October 14, 1911 (Died)
	William Burnham Woods	Associate Justice	Georgia	William Strong	December 21, 1880 (39–8)	January 5, 1881 – May 14, 1887 (Died)
	Stanley Matthews	Associate Justice	Ohio	Noah Haynes Swayne	May 12, 1881 (24–23)	May 17, 1881 – March 22, 1889 (Died)
	Horace Gray	Associate Justice	Massachusetts	Nathan Clifford	December 20, 1881 (51–5)	January 9, 1882 – September 15, 1902 (Died)
	Samuel Blatchford	Associate Justice	New York	Ward Hunt	March 22, 1882 (Acclamation)	April 3, 1882 – July 7, 1893 (Died)

== Notable Cases in 112 U.S. ==
=== Elk v. Wilkins ===
Elk v. Wilkins, 112 U.S. 94 (1884), is a landmark decision of the Supreme Court respecting the citizenship status of Indians. John Elk, a Winnebago Indian, was born on an Indian reservation and later resided with whites on the non-reservation US territory in Omaha, Nebraska, where he renounced his former tribal allegiance and claimed citizenship by virtue of the Citizenship Clause. The case came about after Elk tried to register to vote in 1880 and was denied by Charles Wilkins, the named defendant, who was registrar of voters of the Fifth ward of the City of Omaha.

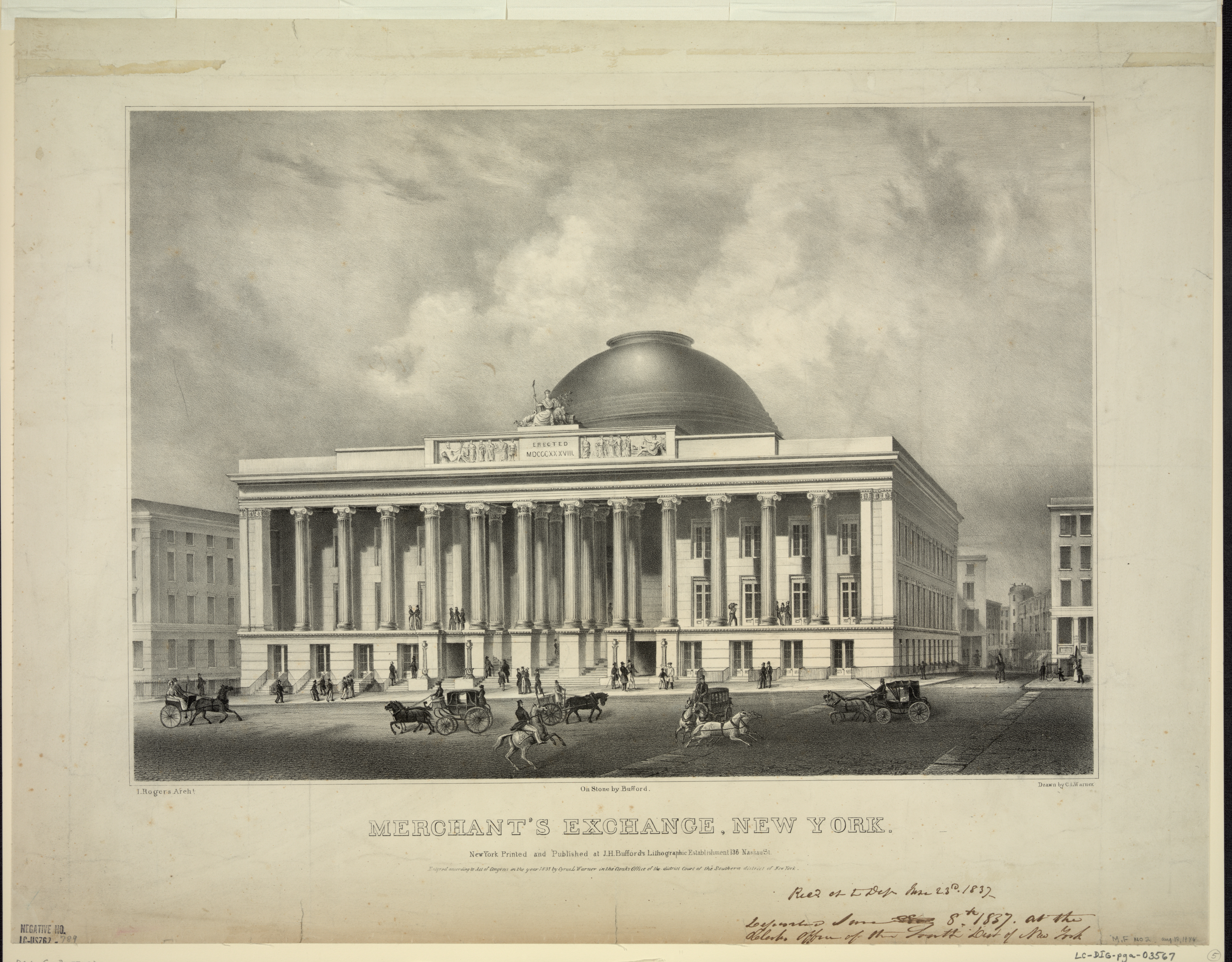
Port of New York Custom House at the time of the Head Money Cases

The Court decided that even though Elk was born in the United States, he was not a citizen because he owed allegiance to his tribe when he was born rather than to the United States and therefore was not subject to the jurisdiction of the United States when he was born.

=== Head Money Cases ===
The Head Money Cases, 112 U.S. 580 (1884), relate to the legal status of treaties. Under the Immigration Act of 1882, officers from the customhouse in the Port of New York began collecting a tax from ships of fifty cents for each immigrant aboard. Multiple ship owners sued because they were transporting Dutch immigrants, and the Netherlands had a treaty with the United States that they claimed prohibited the tax. The decision established that treaties, which are described in the Supremacy Clause of the US Constitution as "the supreme law of the land" equal to any domestic federal law, do not hold a privileged position above other acts of Congress. So, other laws affecting the "enforcement, modification, or repeal" of treaties are legitimate.

== Citation style ==
Under the Judiciary Act of 1789 the federal court structure at the time comprised District Courts, which had general trial jurisdiction; Circuit Courts, which had mixed trial and appellate (from the US District Courts) jurisdiction; and the United States Supreme Court, which had appellate jurisdiction over the federal District and Circuit courts—and for certain issues over state courts. The Supreme Court also had limited original jurisdiction (i.e., in which cases could be filed directly with the Supreme Court without first having been heard by a lower federal or state court). There were one or more federal District Courts and/or Circuit Courts in each state, territory, or other geographical region.

Bluebook citation style is used for case names, citations, and jurisdictions.

- "C.C.D." = United States Circuit Court for the District of . . .
  - e.g.,"C.C.D.N.J." = United States Circuit Court for the District of New Jersey
- "D." = United States District Court for the District of . . .
  - e.g.,"D. Mass." = United States District Court for the District of Massachusetts
- "E." = Eastern; "M." = Middle; "N." = Northern; "S." = Southern; "W." = Western
  - e.g.,"C.C.S.D.N.Y." = United States Circuit Court for the Southern District of New York
  - e.g.,"M.D. Ala." = United States District Court for the Middle District of Alabama
- "Ct. Cl." = United States Court of Claims
- The abbreviation of a state's name alone indicates the highest appellate court in that state's judiciary at the time.
  - e.g.,"Pa." = Supreme Court of Pennsylvania
  - e.g.,"Me." = Supreme Judicial Court of Maine

== List of cases in volume 112 U.S. ==
Case Name	Page and year	Opinion of the Court	Concurring opinion(s)	Dissenting opinion(s)	Lower Court	Disposition
United States v. Morton	1 (1884)	Blatchford	none	none	Ct. Cl.	affirmed
Woodworth v. Blair	8 (1884)	Gray	none	none	C.C.N.D. Ill.	affirmed
New Orleans et al. Ry. v. Mississippi ex rel. District Attorney	12 (1884)	Harlan	none	none	C.C.S.D. Miss.	affirmed
Moffat v. United States	24 (1884)	Field	none	none	C.C.D. Colo.	affirmed
Skidmore v. Pittsburgh, Cincinnati, Chicago and St. Louis Railroad Company	33 (1884)	Waite	none	none	C.C.N.D. Ill.	affirmed
Davies v. Corbin	36 (1884)	Waite	none	none	C.C.E.D. Ark.	dismissal denied
Mellen v. Wallach	41 (1884)	Blatchford	none	none	Sup. Ct. D.C.	reversed
Butterworth v. United States ex rel. Hoe	50 (1884)	Matthews	none	none	Sup. Ct. D.C.	affirmed
Moran v. City of New Orleans	69 (1884)	Matthews	none	none	La.	reversed
United States v. Waddell	76 (1884)	Miller	none	none	C.C.E.D. Ark.	certification
Wilson v. Arrick	83 (1884)	Woods	none	none	Sup. Ct. D.C.	affirmed
United States v. Flanders	88 (1884)	Blatchford	none	none	C.C.E.D. La.	affirmed
Elk v. Wilkins	94 (1884)	Gray	none	Harlan	C.C.D. Neb.	affirmed
Adams County v. Burlington and Missouri River Railroad Company	123 (1884)	Waite	none	none	Iowa	dismissed
Nix v. Allen	129 (1884)	Waite	none	none	C.C.E.D. Ark.	affirmed
Mersman v. Werges	139 (1884)	Gray	none	none	C.C.D. Iowa	reversed
Horbach v. Hill	144 (1884)	Field	none	none	C.C.D. Neb.	reversed
City of Ft. Scott v. Hickman	150 (1884)	Blatchford	none	none	C.C.D. Kan.	reversed
Buena Vista County v. Iowa Falls and Sioux City Railroad Company	165 (1884)	Matthews	none	none	Iowa	affirmed
Ex parte Virginia Commissioners	177 (1884)	Waite	none	none	original	mandamus denied
Ex parte Crouch	178 (1884)	Waite	none	none	original	habeas corpus denied
Ex parte Royall	181 (1884)	Waite	none	none	original	habeas corpus denied
Scotland County v. Hill	183 (1884)	Waite	none	none	C.C.E.D. Mo.	reversed
Ayres v. Wiswall	187 (1884)	Waite	none	none	C.C.E.D. Mich.	affirmed
Great Western Insurance Company v. United States	193 (1884)	Miller	none	none	Ct. Cl.	affirmed
Foster v. Kansas ex rel. Johnston I	201 (1884)	Waite	none	none	Kan.	affirmed
Foster v. Kansas ex rel. Johnston II	205 (1884)	Waite	none	none	Kan.	affirmed
Ranney v. Barlow	207 (1884)	Woods	none	none	C.C.N.D. Ohio	reversed
Snyder v. United States	216 (1884)	Gray	none	none	C.C.D. La.	affirmed
Labette County v. United States ex rel. Moulton	217 (1884)	Matthews	none	none	C.C.D. Kan.	affirmed
Bradstreet Company v. Higgins	227 (1884)	Waite	none	none	C.C.W.D. Mo.	dismissed
Hancock v. Holbrook	229 (1884)	Waite	none	none	C.C.E.D. La.	reversed
California ex rel. Hastings v. Jackson	233 (1884)	Waite	none	none	Cal.	dismissed
Pugh v. Fairmount Gold and Silver Mining Company	238 (1884)	Woods	none	none	C.C.D. Colo.	reversed
Morris v. McMillin	244 (1884)	Woods	none	none	C.C.W.D. Pa.	reversed
Connecticut Mutual Life Insurance Company v. Union Trust Company	250 (1884)	Harlan	none	none	C.C.S.D.N.Y.	affirmed
Grenada County v. Brogden	261 (1884)	Harlan	none	none	N.D. Miss.	affirmed
Grame v. Mutual Assurance Company of Virginia	273 (1884)	Waite	none	none	Va.	dismissed
Exchange National Bank v. Third National Bank	276 (1884)	Blatchford	none	none	C.C.D.N.J.	reversed
Tradesman's National Bank v. Third National Bank	293 (1884)	Blatchford	none	none	C.C.D.N.J.	reversed
Heidritter v. Elizabeth Oil Cloth Company	294 (1884)	Matthews	none	none	C.C.D.N.J.	affirmed
East Tennessee, Virginia and Georgia Railway Company v. Southern Telegraph Company	306 (1884)	Waite	none	none	C.C.M.D. Ala.	dismissal denied
Ogdensburg and Lake Champlain Railroad Company v. Nashua and Lowell Railroad Company	311 (1884)	Miller	none	none	C.C.D.N.H.	affirmed
Bates County v. Winters	325 (1884)	Waite	none	none	C.C.W.D. Mo.	affirmed
Hart v. Pennsylvania Railroad Company	331 (1884)	Blatchford	none	none	C.C.E.D. Mo.	affirmed
Brandies v. Cochrane	344 (1884)	Matthews	none	none	C.C.N.D. Ill.	affirmed
Mahn v. Harwood	354 (1884)	Bradley	none	Miller	C.C.D. Mass.	affirmed
Mackall v. Richards	369 (1884)	Harlan	none	none	Sup. Ct. D.C.	reversed
Chicago, Milwaukee and St. Paul Company v. Ross	377 (1884)	Field	none	Matthews	C.C.D. Minn.	affirmed
Batchelor v. Brereton	396 (1884)	Blatchford	none	none	Sup. Ct. D.C.	affirmed
Reynolds v. Crawfordsville First National Bank	405 (1884)	Woods	none	none	C.C.D. Ind.	affirmed
Kansas Pacific Railway Company v. Atchison, Topeka and Santa Fe Railway Company	414 (1884)	Field	none	none	C.C.D. Kan.	reversed
Richardson v. Traver	423 (1884)	Waite	none	none	C.C.N.D. Ill.	affirmed
Middleton v. Mullica Township, New Jersey	433 (1884)	Bradley	none	none	C.C.D.N.J.	reversed
Fortier v. New Orleans National Bank	439 (1884)	Woods	none	none	C.C.E.D. La.	affirmed
Lámar v. Micou	452 (1884)	Gray	none	none	C.C.S.D.N.Y.	reversed
Carter v. Carusi	478 (1884)	Woods	none	none	Sup. Ct. D.C.	affirmed
Birdsell v. Shaliol	485 (1884)	Gray	none	none	C.C.N.D. Ohio	reversed
Maryland ex rel. Markley v. Baldwin	490 (1884)	Field	none	none	C.C.D. Md.	reversed
Arthur v. Morgan	495 (1884)	Blatchford	none	none	C.C.S.D.N.Y.	affirmed
England v. Gebhardt	502 (1884)	Waite	none	none	C.C.S.D.N.J.	affirmed
New Orleans Insurance Company v. Albro Company	506 (1884)	Waite	none	none	C.C.E.D. La.	affirmed
United States v. North	510 (1884)	Waite	none	none	Ct. Cl.	affirmed
The Elizabeth Jones	514 (1884)	Blatchford	none	none	C.C.N.D. Ill.	affirmed
Britton v. Thornton	526 (1884)	Gray	none	none	C.C.W.D. Pa.	affirmed
Chew Heong v. United States	536 (1884)	Harlan	none	Field, Bradley	C.C.D. Cal.	reversed
Head Money Cases	580 (1884)	Miller	none	none	C.C.E.D.N.Y.	affirmed
Matthews v. Warner	600 (1884)	Miller	none	none	C.C.D. Mass.	affirmed
Bond v. Dustin	604 (1884)	Gray	none	none	C.C.S.D. Ill.	affirmed
Memphis and Little Rock Railroad Company v. Arkansas Railroad Commissioners	609 (1884)	Matthews	none	none	Ark.	affirmed
Union Metallic Cartridge Company v. United States Cartridge Company	624 (1884)	Blatchford	none	none	C.C.D. Mass.	reversed
United States v. Great Falls Manufacturing Company	645 (1884)	Harlan	none	none	Ct. Cl.	affirmed
Torrent Arms Lumber Company v. Rodgers	659 (1884)	Woods	none	none	C.C.W.D. Mich.	reversed
Town of Martinton v. Fairbanks	670 (1885)	Woods	none	none	C.C.N.D. Ill.	affirmed
Streeper v. Victor Sewing Machine Company	676 (1885)	Blatchford	none	none	Sup. Ct. Terr. Utah	affirmed
Murphy v. Victor Sewing Machine Company	688 (1885)	Blatchford	none	none	Sup. Ct. Terr. Utah	affirmed
Whitney v. Morrow	693 (1885)	Field	none	none	Wis.	affirmed
Knickerbocker Life Insurance Company v. Pendleton	696 (1885)	Bradley	none	none	C.C.W.D. Tenn.	reversed
Power v. Baker	710 (1884)	Waite	none	none	C.C.D. Minn.	vacation denied
Scharff v. Levy	711 (1885)	Waite	none	none	C.C.E.D. Mo.	affirmed
Halferty v. Wilmering	713 (1885)	Matthews	none	none	C.C.D. Iowa	reversed
Mattoon v. McGrew	713 (1884)	Waite	none	none	Sup. Ct. D.C.	reversed
Thayer v. Life Association of America	717 (1885)	Harlan	none	none	C.C.D.W. Va.	reversed
St. Paul and Sioux City Railroad Company v. Winona and St. Peter Railroad Company	720 (1885)	Miller	none	none	Minn.	affirmed
St. Paul and Duluth Railroad Company v. United States	733 (1885)	Matthews	none	none	Ct. Cl.	affirmed
Peugh v. Porter	737 (1885)	Matthews	none	none	Sup. Ct. D.C.	reversed
