= Ferris v. Frohman =

- Supreme Court of the United States

Submitted November 7, 1911 Decided February 19, 1912
- Full case name: Ferris v. Frohman
- Citations: 223 U.S. 424 (more) 32 S. Ct. 263; 56 L. Ed. 492

Holding
- An unauthorized public production of an unpublished play does not invalidate the play owner's common law copyright.

Court membership
- Chief Justice Edward D. White Associate Justices Joseph McKenna · Oliver W. Holmes Jr. William R. Day · Horace H. Lurton; Charles E. Hughes · Willis Van Devanter; Joseph R. Lamar

Case opinion
- Majority: Hughes, joined by unanimous

Ferris v. Frohman, 223 U.S. 424 (1912), was a United States Supreme Court case in which the Court held an unauthorized public production of an unpublished play does not invalidate the play owner's common law copyright.
