= Quong Wing v. Kirkendall =

- Supreme Court of the United States

Argued December 18, 1911 Decided January 22, 1912
- Full case name: Quong Wing v. Kirkendall
- Docket no.: 119
- Citations: 223 U.S. 59 (more)

Holding
- A State does not deny the equal protection of the laws merely by adjusting its revenue laws and taxing system in such a way as to favor certain industries or forms of industry.

Court membership
- Chief Justice Edward D. White Associate Justices Joseph McKenna · Oliver W. Holmes Jr. William R. Day · Horace H. Lurton; Charles E. Hughes · Willis Van Devanter; Joseph R. Lamar

Case opinions
- Majority: Holmes
- Dissent: Lamar

Quong Wing v. Kirkendall, 223 U.S. 59 (1912), was a United States Supreme Court case in which the Court held that a State does not deny the equal protection of the laws merely by adjusting its revenue laws and taxing system in such a way as to favor certain industries or forms of industry. This was one of the earliest cases to articulate the principle of rational basis review.

== Background ==
Quong Wing operated a hand laundry in Lewis and Clark County, Montana. Under Section 2776 of Montana's Revised Codes, operators of laundries that did not use steam power were required to pay a license fee of $10 per quarter. Steam laundries were exempt, as were laundries employing no more than two women.

Wing paid the fee under protest and brought an action against Thomas B. Kirkendall, the county treasurer, seeking to recover the $10. He argued that the law violated the Equal Protection Clause of the Fourteenth Amendment because it imposed a tax on his business while exempting other laundries performing substantially the same work.

== Lower court proceedings ==
The district court of Lewis and Clark County ruled in Wing's favor. Kirkendall appealed to the Montana Supreme Court, which reversed the judgment on April 24, 1909.

Writing for the court, Justice Henry C. Smith concluded that the legislature could distinguish between steam-powered and hand-operated laundries for taxation purposes. The court also upheld the exemption for laundries employing no more than two women, reasoning that the legislature could provide special treatment for women who depended on laundry work for their livelihood. The court relied in part on the U.S. Supreme Court's decision in Muller v. Oregon (1908), which had upheld restrictions on women's working hours.

Wing appealed to the Supreme Court of the United States, which heard oral arguments on December 18, 1911.

== Supreme Court decision ==
On January 22, 1912, the U.S. Supreme Court affirmed the Montana Supreme Court's judgment. Writing for the majority, Justice Oliver Wendell Holmes Jr. held that states could impose different taxes on different types of businesses without violating the Equal Protection Clause, provided the distinctions were not unreasonable or arbitrary.

The Court also upheld the exemption for laundries employing no more than two women. Citing Muller v. Oregon (1908), Holmes noted that distinctions based on sex had previously been upheld in other areas of legislation.

Holmes raised the question of whether the statute was intended to discriminate against Chinese laundry operators, citing Yick Wo v. Hopkins (1886). However, Wing's attorneys had not raised racial discrimination as a constitutional objection and had expressly disclaimed it during oral argument. The Court therefore declined to consider the issue, leaving it unresolved.

=== Dissent ===
Justice Joseph Rucker Lamar dissented, arguing that the law arbitrarily taxed small hand laundries while exempting larger steam laundries, and that the sex of a business owner was not a valid basis for different tax treatment.

== Later decisions ==
The Supreme Court cited Quong Wing in Metropolis Theatre Co. v. Chicago (1913), upholding different license fees for theaters, and State Board of Tax Commissioners v. Jackson (1931), which upheld a graduated license tax on chain stores. The Louisiana Supreme Court also relied on the decision in State v. Crescent City Laundries, Inc. (1936), upholding a license tax on steam laundries despite an exemption for smaller manual operators.
