= Act of government (French law) =

French doctrine excluding certain executive measures from judicial review

In French administrative law, acts of government (French: actes de gouvernement) are executive measures that are not subject to judicial review because they concern either relations among constitutional authorities or the conduct of France's foreign relations. The doctrine is narrow and defined by case law rather than legislation or a general legal test.

== Operation ==
France has separate administrative and ordinary court systems. Most administrative claims begin in an administrative tribunal. Challenges to decrees and certain measures by the national government, including ministers' regulations of national scope, begin in the Conseil d'État. The Conseil d'État may therefore encounter the doctrine when hearing a claim assigned directly to it or when reviewing a lower court's judgment.

The court hearing the claim determines whether the challenged measure is an ordinary administrative act, a measure separable from an act of government, or an act of government. If it finds an act of government, it dismisses the affected claim for lack of jurisdiction without deciding the measure's legality. A court may raise the absence of jurisdiction on its own.

In Mechalikh, the Conseil d'État treated France's failure to repatriate the claimant, whose father had served as an Algerian auxiliary in the French Army and who remained in Algeria until 1980, as inseparable from relations with Algeria. In the companion case Tamazount, it held that the family's treatment in camps after reaching France was reviewable.

When the administrative and ordinary courts disagree about jurisdiction, the Tribunal des conflits may determine which order of courts, if either, can hear the claim. In Israel Shipyards, it held that neither order had jurisdiction to review France's decision to exclude certain Israeli exhibitors from a naval defence exhibition because the decision was inseparable from France's foreign relations.

== Development ==
Early decisions treated an executive measure's political motive as sufficient to prevent review. In Laffitte, the Conseil d'État declined jurisdiction over a politically motivated measure. In Prince Napoléon, it abandoned that test and held that political motivation alone did not remove an administrative act from judicial review. The doctrine nevertheless survived in two narrower categories: relations among constitutional authorities and foreign relations.

== Scope ==
=== Relations among constitutional authorities ===
The first category concerns relations between the executive and legislature under the Constitution of France. It includes:

- A refusal or failure to introduce a bill.
- The promulgation of a law.
- The decision to submit a bill to a referendum.
- The dissolution of the National Assembly.
- The decision to invoke the President's emergency powers under Article 16 of the Constitution. Measures taken under Article 16 are subject to review by the administrative courts when regulatory rather than legislative in character.

=== Foreign relations ===
The second category covers measures inseparable from France's relations with foreign states or international organizations. Examples include:

- The suspension of treaties or international agreements.
- The resumption of nuclear weapons testing in connection with negotiations over an international ban.
- The suspension of scientific and technical cooperation with Iraq and the exclusion of Iraqi students from universities during the Gulf War.
- The refusal of a general request to suspend arms export licences to a foreign country.

== Limits and remedies ==
Measures separable from foreign relations remain reviewable. The Conseil d'État has reviewed decrees of extradition, including a refusal to extradite a person to Hong Kong; interpreted treaties without deferring to the foreign ministry; reviewed whether a treaty's ratification had received constitutionally required authorization; and reviewed national visa rules adopted under European Union law.

An act of government cannot ordinarily be annulled, and damages cannot be awarded on the ground that the government acted wrongfully. In Mutuelle centrale de réassurance, however, the Conseil d'État held that an administrative court may award damages under liability without fault when an act inseparable from foreign relations imposes a special and exceptionally serious burden. The remedy is unavailable if it would interfere with foreign policy, if the measure was directed at the claimant, if the injury was caused directly by a foreign state or war, or if a special compensation scheme exists.

The European Court of Human Rights has imposed procedural limits without invalidating the doctrine generally. In H.F. and Others v. France, it held that there is no general right to repatriation, but that exceptional circumstances surrounding French women and children held in camps in Syria required refusals of repatriation to receive independent review with safeguards against arbitrariness under Protocol No. 4. In Tamazount and Others v. France, it found no violation of the right of access to a court where the doctrine had been applied narrowly and a claim based on liability without fault remained available.

== See also ==
- Act of state doctrine
- Political question
- Separation of powers
- Law of France
