= Passenger Cases =

- Supreme Court of the United States

Decided January 3, 1849
- Full case name: George Smith, Plaintiff in Error v. William Turner, Health-Commissioner of the Port of New York; James Norris, Plaintiff in Error v. The City of Boston
- Citations: 48 U.S. 283 (more) 7 How. 283; 12 L. Ed. 702

Holding
- It is unconstitutional for states to impose a tax based on the number of incoming immigrants on board or disembarking from a ship.

Court membership
- Chief Justice Roger B. Taney Associate Justices John McLean · James M. Wayne; John Catron · John McKinley; Peter V. Daniel · Samuel Nelson; Levi Woodbury · Robert C. Grier

Case opinions
- Seriatim: McLean
- Seriatim: Wayne
- Seriatim: Catron
- Seriatim: McKinley
- Seriatim: Grier
- Dissent: Taney
- Dissent: Daniel
- Dissent: Nelson
- Dissent: Woodbury

Smith v. Turner and Norris v. Boston, 48 U.S. (7 How.) 283 (1849), were two similar cases, argued together before the United States Supreme Court, which decided 5–4 that it is unconstitutional for states to impose a tax based on the number of incoming immigrants on board or disembarking from a ship. The cases are also known as the Passenger Case or the Passenger Cases.

The Court did not produce a majority opinion. Eight Justices authored separate opinions, and the respective stances on various issues did not always align with other Justices in their concurrences or dissents. The issues addressed in the various opinions included the following:

- Whether the Commerce Clause exclusively commits the power to regulate foreign commerce, interstate commerce and commerce with the Indian tribes to the federal government and thus makes state regulation concerning foreign commerce an unconstitutional violation of the Commerce Clause, or whether the states were free to regulate until such regulation conflicted with a valid federal regulation or involved an area that could be regulated only on a uniform basis.
- Whether regulation of migration of free individuals (as distinct from slaves) was included in the meaning of "commerce" covered by the Commerce Clause.
- Whether states had an absolute right to determine who could enter its geographical domain that could not be compromised, even by ratification of a foreign treaty, by the federal government except with respect to federal officials, employees and agents, and foreign diplomats.
- Whether the federal government had any constitutional authority to regulate immigration from foreign nations (as distinct from its acknowledged power to determine which immigrants could be naturalized).
- Whether such laws violated the requirement of the introductory clause of Article I, Section 8, of the US Constitution, mandating any imposts to be "uniform throughout the United States.
- Whether Article I, Section 9, of the Constitution, making 1808 a watershed date regarding congressional power over "Such Persons as any of the States now existing should think proper to admit," referred only to the slave trade or also to immigration of free persons.
- Whether the nature of the New York and the Massachusetts laws imposed a tax on the passengers or on the ships, and the implications of this distinction with respect to the nature of the taxation power of the states; and for those Justices concurring in the judgment of the Court; and the status and meaning of City of New York vs. Miln.

The Passenger Cases is of historical interest. It portrays a diversity of views on several constitutional questions, especially whether the Commerce Clause prohibits any state regulation of interstate and foreign commerce in the absence of federal law or treaty. A bitter personal attack on Chief Justice Taney by Justice Wayne also provided a glimpse of the personal dynamics of the fractious court. However, the failure of the court to produce a majority opinion significantly diminished the value of the Passengers Case as formal legal precedent.

== Background ==
In each case, a state imposed a tax to be collected from the master of a ship entering a harbor of that state. In each case, the captain of a British ship challenged the constitutionality of the state law. Other facts varied between the two cases.

=== Smith v. Turner ===
The State of New York imposed a tax on the passenger and the crew of each ship entering the Port of New York at the following rates:

- If the vessel traveled from Connecticut, New Jersey or Rhode Island, the tax would be 25 cents for each person on board on the first occasion of each month such ship entered the Port of New York.
- If the vessel traveled from another state, the tax would be 25 cents for each person on board with respect to each voyage including an entry into the Port of New York.
- If the vessel traveled from a foreign port, the tax would be $1.50 for the master of the ship, $1.50 for each passenger of cabin class, $1.00 for each other crew member, and $1.00 for each passenger of steerage class.

The revenues collected would be first directed to cover expenses of a marine hospital to care for those who arrived in a sickened state at the Port of New York. Excess revenues not needed for the maintenance of the marine hospital were redirected to the Society for the Reformation of Juvenile Delinquents in the City of New York, a charitable organization caring for and confining delinquent boys.

Smith was the master of Henry Bliss, a British ship. It sailed from Liverpool, England, and entered the Port of New York in June 1841. Steerage-class passengers, 295 in number, disembarked in New York City. Smith refused to pay the portion of the New York State tax that was measured by these steerage-class passengers. Turner, the Health Commissioner of the Port of New York, sued Smith for $295 in taxes due under New York State law.

=== Norris v. City of Boston ===
Massachusetts had a law that required an appropriate official to board each ship that had alien passengers on board and had entered one of its port of that State. The official was to examine each alien passenger and determine which of them, if any, were a lunatic, an idiot, maimed, aged, an infirm person, an incompetent, or a current or former pauper or who had been a pauper. Such a passenger would be permitted to disembark only upon the posting of a bond for $1000. Other alien passengers would be permitted to disembark upon the payment of a tax by the master, owner, consignee, or agent of such vessel amounting to the sum of $2.00 for each such passenger so disembarking.

The revenue collected would be directed to a fund to pay for the support of aliens who had become paupers in Massachusetts.

Norris was the master of the Union Jack, a schooner from St. John, of the Province of New Brunswick, then part of the British Empire. It sailed from St. John and arrived in the Boston harbor on June 26, 1837. Norris was compelled by Bailey, an official of Boston, to pay $38.00 before the 19 alien passengers, none of whom being in such a state or having such a history requiring the posting of a bond, were permitted to disembark. Norris sued the City of Boston to recover the $38.00 as having been improperly compelled.

== Decision ==
In each case, the Supreme Court held 5-4 that part of the respective State statute to be unconstitutional. A federal constitutional principle, known as "standing," precludes the giving of an advisory opinion, a pronouncement of a decision that goes beyond the facts and record of the particular case. Thus, parts of the respective statutes not implicated by the specific facts of the case are not supposed to be ruled upon until a case involving a contest over such matters is actually presented to the court.

In Smith v. Turner, the portion of the New York statute concerning the collection of a tax measured by the number of steerage-class passengers from ships arriving from a foreign port was declared unconstitutional.

In Norris v. City of Boston, that portion of the Massachusetts law imposing a tax measured by the number of alien passengers allowed to disembark without a bond was struck down as unconstitutional.

All told, the cases were one of the longest set of opinions in Supreme Court history up to that point.

=== Concurring opinions ===
Justices McLean, Wayne, Catron, McKinley and Grier all concurred with the judgment of the United States Supreme Court in both cases. All five of the concurring Justices wrote a concurring opinion. The opinions of McLean and Wayne addressed the various issues that they considered to be implicated in both cases. Catron's opinion addressed only the Smith (New York) case; Grier's opinion addressed only the Norris (Massachusetts) case. Catron and Grier unequivocally joined each other's respective opinions. Wayne also endorsed Catron's and Grier's opinions. McKinley's opinion was limited to a discussion of the first clause of Article I, Section 9 of the US Constitution. (McKinley's opinion on that topic was also endorsed by Wayne.) McKinley may be deemed to be joining Grier's opinion (concerning the Norris case), as he stated that such opinion had expressed their "joint views in the cause coming up from Massachusetts" and that the writing of such opinion by Grier "has been done to [McKinley's] entire satisfaction."

McKinley remarked that he had "examined the opinions of... McLean and... Catron, and concur with the whole reasoning upon the main question." What McKinley viewed as that "main question" is not explained but probably referred to the apparently harmonious views of McLean and Catron concerning the nature of the Commerce Clause and its implications with respect to the reserved taxation and police powers of the states. The sequence in which the concurring opinions appear in the official reports follows the seniority of the respective concurring Justices who authored each opinion.

=== McLean's opinion ===
Justice McLean, the most senior member of the Court at the time, began his opinion by weighing in on the debate concerning the nature of the Commerce Clause. He asserted that the Commerce Clause "is exclusively vested in Congress." Therefore, if the federal government does not regulate a particular area of foreign or interstate commerce, the omission is not an invitation to the states to provide interim regulation but is an expression of federal policy that the area should remain unregulated.

McLean derived that interpretation of the Commerce Clause from a fundamental rejection of the concept of concurrent power. Only one authority can exercise any given power, and the judicial task is to determine whether a particular subject falls within a power delegated to the federal government or within a power reserved to the states. McLean denied that a power may be exercised by the states unless the federal government chooses to exercise the same power when state regulation is trumped by the federal action. Although he recognized that both Congress and the states may impose a tax on the same object, he insisted that the respective taxations result from the exercise of distinct powers and do not represent any concurrent exercise of the same power.

It is unclear what role the Supremacy Clause had in McLean's constitutional theory since he apparently viewed each level of government as supreme in its own legitimate and distinct sphere of operations.

One of the key debates in the Passenger Cases concerned the question whether the transport of free persons, as distinct from goods and slaves, was to be included or excluded from the concept of "commerce" for purposes of the Commerce Clause. McLean construed the Commerce Clause to include the transport of free persons within its scope. In support, McLean cited the following passage from Gibbons v. Ogden: "the power to regulate commerce applies equally to the regulation of vessels employed in transporting men who pass from place to place voluntarily, and to those who pass involuntarily."

McLean wrote in his opinion, "A state cannot regulate foreign commerce, but it may do many things which more or less affect it." Thus, the next judicial task was to discern whether the New York tax was a regulation of foreign and interstate commerce or merely an exercise of legitimate state authority having an incidental effect on foreign and interstate commerce.

McLean did not consider attempts on the part of a State to defend itself from the introduction of harm to be a regulation of commerce. Thus, McLean viewed exclusion of infectious people from the state as a quarantine measure and part of the state's reserved right to protect the health of its citizens and in no sense a regulation of foreign or interstate commerce. He further acknowledged that a state may charge a fee reflecting the actual cost of the inspection for disease. He also acknowledged a right for states to prevent the entry of paupers to prevent the imposition of an economic burden. However, McLean did not recognize an unqualified right of the states to screen new entrants: "Except to guard its citizens against diseases and paupers, the municipal power of a state cannot prohibit the introduction of foreigners brought to this country under the authority of Congress."

McLean rejected the characterization of the New York statute as a health measure. Although the revenues were applied in the first instance to a hospital, surplus revenues were diverted to a charitable society in New York City caring for delinquent boys. To McLean, a law that demanded payment beyond a fee for actual cost of inspection was a revenue measure, with no principled limitation that could be placed on the state as to the use of that revenue. McLean insisted that the law imposed a tax on passengers and crew and that if a tax of $1.00 per passenger could be extracted by New York, a higher tax could also be imposed, including in an amount that would completely stifle the commercial activity of transporting passengers into the Port of New York. McLean thus concluded that the New York statute at bar was a regulation of commerce and an intrinsic violation of the Commerce Clause.

McLean also considered the New York law a violation of Article I, Section 8, of the US Constitution, requiring all duties, imposts, and excises to be uniform throughout the United States. McLean considered the clause to be enforceable against the states as well as Congress and considered a tax on passengers entering the United States to be an "impost" and a state tax on such passengers to have the effect of making such imposts non-uniform.

He went beyond the facts of the case to comment (as dictum) that the tax, when applied to the crew and passengers of coastal vessels traveling from other states, violated the sixth clause of Article I, Section 9, prohibiting the imposition of duties on vessels traveling from one state to another.

McLean commented that under the Commerce Clause, the Massachusetts tax on immigrant passengers was unconstitutional. McLean did not refer to his views regarding uniformity of imposts in his short discussion of the latter case.

McLean did not join the vituperative debate concerning the manner in which the majority opinion in City of New York v. Miln was adopted, but he reconciled his assent to the majority opinion in the Miln decision with his opinion in the Passenger Cases by noting that the Miln case involved no question concerning the validity of a tax but only the validity of a reporting requirement.

=== Wayne's opinion ===
Justice Wayne's concurrence with the judgment, although referring to several particular provisions of the US Constitution, was apparently derived from a holistic understanding of the general impact of all of its provisions on commerce as well as the nature of commerce as it exists, even in the absence of formal documents such as the Constitution or the preceding Articles of Confederation. His analysis was formed from a consideration of many provisions of Article I of theConstitution, including the proviso of the first clause of its Section 8 on the uniformity of "Duties, Imposts and Excises;" the passages of the third clause of Section 8 authorizing Congress to "regulate Commerce with foreign Nations, and among the several States" (the Commerce Clause); the passage of the fourth clause of Section 8 authorizing Congress to "establish a uniform Rule of Naturalization!;" and the passage of the clause prohibiting any "Preference" with respect to any "Regulation of Commerce or Revenue to the Ports of one State over those of another;" the provision of the first clause of Section 10, prohibiting the states from entering into any treaty; the provisions of the second clause of Section 10 prohibiting the states from laying, without the consent of Congress, any "imposts or Duties on Imports or Exports, except what may be absolutely necessary for executing its inspection Laws;" and the provisions of the Third Clause of Section 10, prohibiting the States, again without the consent of Congress, from laying any duty of tonnage, or entering into any "Agreement or Compact with another State."

To Wayne, one has to examine the nature of commerce to understand the meaning of the Commerce Clause, which authorizes Congress to "regulate Commerce with foreign Nations, and among the several States...." Wayne noted that even without explication in a formal document such as a constitution, nations, at least in Europe, had recognized traditions of regulating their commerce in ways that varied between peacetime and wartime conditions. Under the European tradition "[a] nation is... fully authorized to prohibit the entry or exportation of certain merchandise, to institute customs and to augment them at pleasure, to prescribe the manner in which the commerce with its dominions shall be carried on, to point out the places where it shall be carried on, or to exempt from it certain parts of its dominions, to exercise freely its sovereign power over the foreigners living in its territories, [and] to make whatever distinctions between the nations with whom it trades it may find conducive to its interests." According to Wayne, the very nature of commerce, as experienced in the European tradition and brought forth into the Commerce Clause, had to be a matter for the regulation of the nation as a whole: "Keeping, then, in mind what commerce is, and how far a nation may legally limit her own commercial transactions with another state, we cannot be at a loss to determine, from the subject matter of the clause in the Constitution, that the meaning of the terms used in it is to exclude the states from regulating commerce in any way, except their own internal trade, and to confide its legislative regulation completely and entirely to Congress." Wayne did not recapitulate the various ways in which Congress, by treaty and statute, actually regulates that foreign commerce on immigrants and other alien passengers from abroad, particularly from Britain, preferring to incorporate by reference the detailed treatment of these measures by Catron.

Notwithstanding the firmness of his opinion regarding the right of Congress, to the complete exclusion of state prerogative, to regulate foreign and interstate commerce, and even his view that the exclusivity principle had been authoritatively established by prior precedent of the Supreme Court, Wayne criticized a parallel discussion of Justice McLean and announced that he and the other Justices concurring in the judgment "do not think it necessary in these cases to reaffirm,... what this Court has long since decided, that the constitutional power to regulate 'commerce with foreign nations, and among the several states and with the Indian tribes,' is exclusively vested in Congress and that no part of it can be exercised by a state." He reasoned that even those who take the position that the states have the right to regulate foreign and interstate commerce in the absence of federal regulation readily admit that when the federal government actively regulates some aspect of foreign or interstate commerce, the states are prohibited by the Supremacy Clause from enacting or enforcing any law inconsistent with the federal law. He deemed that the federal government had engaged in regulating foreign commerce regarding passengers arriving from Britain when it entered into a series of treaties with that country. Wayne declared that the New York and Massachusetts statutes "conflict with treaty stipulations existing between the United States and Great Britain, permitting the inhabitants of the two countries 'freely and securely to come, with their ships and cargoes, to all places, ports, and rivers in the territories of each country to which other foreigners are permitted to come, to enter into the same, and to remain and reside in any parts of said territories, respectively;....'"

To Wayne, taxes represent a cost, which may be imposed on some item, person, activity, or status that is already within or relates to what or who is already within the jurisdiction of the taxing authority. Duties and imposts are levied upon items and/or persons coming into the jurisdiction of the levying authority. Wayne also observes a distinction between commerce, which concerns an exchange or transportation of persons, goods, documents, or information, on the one hand, and police powers, which concern the regulation of the conduct of persons and the condition of persons/or items within the jurisdiction, on the other hand. Wayne recognized that states have very broad powers of taxation but insisted that some of that power of taxation was yielded with the adoption of the Constitution. The general principle that he adopted was that if a power is delegated to Congress or to the national government, so much of the power of taxation that might interfere with the prerogatives of Congress and the federal government are constrained in service of the federal system. Specifically, the exclusive federal control over immigration and naturalization precludes any state taxation that would interfere with federal policy in those areas.

Wayne, like all other Justices, recognized states as the primary repository of "police powers." (The federal government can exercise "police powers" only in territory that is federal: District of Columbia, territories, and federal enclaves in the States, such as military bases and federal buildings.) "Police powers" encompass the various measures taken to assure the safety and well-being of people at the local level. Thus, the police power of a state to protect the health of its residents includes the right to exclude from its territory diseased people. A curious example of police power, recognized by all of the Justices involved in the Passenger Case, was the right of slave States to exclude free citizens from Sub-Saharan Africa, for fear that they might help organize slave rebellions. However, the police power that was most critical, especially to part of the Massachusetts statute, was the right of a state to protect its economy and social fabric from an onslaught of paupers. The judgment in Norris technically did not strike down the portion of the statute concerning paupers. However, Wayne insisted that analysis of the various views of the five Justices concurring in the judgment establishes the willingness of a majority of the Supreme Court to strike down state taxation of immigrant paupers or the shipping companies that bring them to shore. To Wayne the goal of rebuffing paupers was legitimate, but taxation was an unconstitutional means. He counseled states to examine immigrants and expel those found to be diseased, paupers, fugitives from criminal justice, or those otherwise unworthy of admission for other reasons related to the welfare of the citizens and residents of the state. Wayne even commented in dictum that if Congress ever exercised its power of regulating immigration to compel states to accept such persons, that the United States Supreme Court would readily strike down such a federal statute as unconstitutional.

The clause of Section 9 of Article I of the Constitution prohibiting any "Preference" with respect to "Regulation of Commerce or Revenue to the Ports of one State over those of another" is not limited to federal action but also precludes any action by the states that would result in such a preference. Wayne deems a tax of the nature imposed by the New York and Massachusetts statutes to create a "Preference" between ports, in violation of the Constitution. Wayne construed the clause to even prohibit implicitly a state from creating a situation that would disadvantage the usage of its own port if that had the consequence of creating a preference for shippers in favor of the ports of other states.

Wayne used a parallel logic in construing the first clause of Section 8 of Article I of the Constitution, which qualified the authority of Congress to "lay and collect Taxes, Duties, Imposts and Excises" with a provision that "all Duties, Imposts and Excises shall be uniform throughout the United States." Again, although Article I concerns Congress and Section 9 concerns an authority expressly granted to Congress, Wayne construed uniformity as not only placing a limitation on the exercise of Congressional power but also imposing on the states the duty not to compromise the uniformity of "Duties, Imposts and Excises" collected "throughout the United States."

In addition to Wayne's discussion of the constitutional issues, he expounded at length on the alleged history and imputed status of Miln. According to Wayne, the opinion authored by Justice Barbour, which purports to be the official opinion of the Supreme Court in that case, "had not at any time the concurrence of a majority of its members." He also bitterly accused Chief Justice Taney of knowingly disregarding that supposed fact and thus creating a false precedent in the official reports.

=== Catron's opinion ===
As noted above, Justice Catron's opinion ostensibly addressed only the New York case. However, its discussion of congressional statutes and treaties applaud to both the New York and the Massachusetts cases.

Catron discussed federal law on naturalization of immigrants as American citizens. The Declaration of Independence had included in the offenses of the British King that he had "endeavored to prevent the population of the colonies by obstructing the laws for the naturalization of foreigners, and refusing to pass others to encourage their migration hither." The US Constitution commits to Congress the power "to establish a uniform rule of naturalization." Catron discussed congressional implementation of its jurisdiction over naturalization. On March 26, 1790, Congress enacted legislation, permitting any immigrant alien who was a "free white person" to become a naturalized United States citizen after only two years of residence in the United States. Congress later (April 14, 1802) amended the naturalization statute to require five years of residence. Catron waxed regarding the benefits that promoting immigration had conferred on the United States:

Under these laws have been admitted such numbers, that they and their descendants constitute a great part of our population. Every department of science, of labor, occupation, and pursuit, is filled up, more or less, by naturalized citizens and their numerous offspring. From the first day of our separate existence to this time has the policy of drawing hither aliens, to the end of becoming citizens, been a favorite policy of the United States; it has been cherished by Congress with rare steadiness and vigor. By this policy our extensive and fertile country has been, to a considerable extent, filled up by a respectable population, both physically and mentally, one that is easily governed and usually of approved patriotism."

Catron had no doubt that the 295 immigrants aboard the Henry Bliss whom New York State proposed to tax were responding to that federal policy:

We have invited to come to our country from other lands all free white persons, of every grade and of every religious belief, and when here to enjoy our protection, and at the end of five years to enjoy all our rights, except that of becoming President of the United States. Pursuant to this notorious and long established policy, the two hundred and ninety-five passengers in the Henry Bliss arrived at the port of New York."

Catron observed that the states may not tax goods or possessions of immigrant passengers and cited both a federal statute and the Supreme Court opinion of Brown v. Maryland. He then posed the question as to whether the result should be any different with respect to taxation based on the passengers themselves.

== Taney's dissent ==
Taney dissented from the rationale that "the money demanded is a tax on the captain of the vessel, and therefore a regulation of commerce". He wrote that the commerce clause did not prohibit state taxation or restrict the taxing power of the state:

The taxing power of the State is restrained only where the tax is directly or indirectly a duty on imports or tonnage. And the case before us is the first in which this power has been held to be still further abridged by mere affirmative grants of power to the general government.

== See also ==
- Head Money Cases A similar U.S. Supreme Court case over a head tax imposed on Dutch immigrants.
- Henderson v. Mayor of New York
- List of United States Supreme Court cases, volume 48
