= Henderson v. Mayor of New York =

- Supreme Court of the United States

Argued January 13, 1876 Decided March 20, 1876
- Full case name: Henderson et al. v. Mayor of the City of New York et al.
- Citations: 92 U.S. 259 (more)

Holding
- New York's imposition of a tax per passenger arriving by ship was an invalid state regulation of foreign commerce

Court membership
- Chief Justice Morrison Waite Associate Justices Nathan Clifford · Noah H. Swayne; Samuel F. Miller · David Davis; Stephen J. Field · William Strong; Joseph P. Bradley · Ward Hunt

Case opinion
- Majority: Miller, joined by unanimous

Laws applied
- Dormant Commerce Clause

Henderson v. Mayor of New York, 92 U.S. 259 (1876), was decision of the United States Supreme Court in which the court held that New York's imposition of a tax per passenger arriving by ship was an invalid state regulation of foreign commerce.

== Background ==
Since 1824, the state of New York had required that every vessel arriving in the port of New York provide a sworn report to the mayor of any passengers from other countries and states. The law further required the payment of a bond for expenses that could arise resulting from accident, sickness or poverty of the passenger. The report of passenger information was upheld by the Supreme Court in Mayor of New York v. Miln (1837) as a legitimate exercise of the state police power. Justice Joseph Story dissented from that decision.

In the Passenger Cases (1849), the Supreme Court struck down state taxes based on the number of incoming immigrants on board or disembarking from a ship because it was an unconstitutional regulation of foreign commerce. To get around this, some states designed similar taxes to appear like more-palatable exercises of their police powers.

At the time of this case, the steamship companies that brought passengers to the United States were taxed for every healthy passenger that made it into the country. They included this fee in the ticket price but considered it a burden on their business. Without the tax, they reasoned they could sell more tickets.

The lawsuit was filed in the Circuit Court for the Southern District of New York by two British brothers whose steamship company the Henderson Brothers ran a vessel between Glasgow and New York. The Circuit Court upheld the New York laws. The brothers brought the case to the Supreme Court alleging that the state law infringed upon an exclusive Congressional power over foreign commerce.

== Supreme Court ==
Quoting Chief Justice John Marshall's decision in Gibbons v. Ogden the Court asserted the supremacy of the Constitution: "In every such case the act of Congress or the treaty is supreme; and the laws of the State, though enacted in the exercise of powers not controverted, must yield to it." Chief Justice Roger Taney preferred a narrower commerce clause than Gibbons. The Taney Court's decision in Cooley v. Board of Wardens authored by Justice Benjamin Robbins Curtis was a compromise position articulating a doctrine of partial federal exclusivity. In Cooley Justice Curtis said the power to regulate commerce was exclusive to Congress when "subjects of this power are in their nature national, or admit only of one uniform system, or plan of regulation". States could exercise their police powers when the subject matter was local but not when it was national.

Despite the similarity of the tax provisions in the Passenger Cases there was no majority opinion for that case and Justice Miller based the decision on the more persuasive reasoning of Cooley.

== See also ==
- Chy Lung v. Freeman

== Sources ==
- Hirota, Hidetaka (2017). Expelling the Poor: Atlantic Seaboard States and the Nineteenth-century Origins of American Immigration Policy. Oxford University Press. ISBN 9780190619213.
- Currie, David P. (1992). The Constitution in the Supreme Court: The First Hundred Years, 1789-1888. University of Chicago Press. ISBN 9780226131092.
- Frankfurter, Felix (1936). "Taney and the Commerce Clause". Harvard Law Review. 49 (8): 1291. doi:10.2307/1333024. JSTOR 1333024.
- Haines, Charles Grove (1957). The role of the supreme court in American government and politics 1835-1864. University of California Press.
- White, G. Edward (2016). Law in American History, Volume II: From Reconstruction Through the 1920s. Oxford University Press. ISBN 9780199930999.
