= Luther v. Borden =

- Supreme Court of the United States

Decided January 3, 1849
- Full case name: Martin Luther v. Luther M. Borden
- Citations: 48 U.S. 1 (more) 7 How. 1; 12 L. Ed. 581; 1849 U.S. LEXIS 337

Holding
- Whether a state government is a legitimate republican form as guaranteed by the Constitution is a political question to be resolved by the President and Congress.

Court membership
- Chief Justice Roger B. Taney Associate Justices John McLean · James M. Wayne; John Catron · John McKinley; Peter V. Daniel · Samuel Nelson; Levi Woodbury · Robert C. Grier

Case opinions
- Majority: Taney, joined by McLean, Wayne, Nelson, Grier
- Dissent: Woodbury
- Catron, McKinley, and Daniel took no part in the consideration or decision of the case.

Laws applied
- U.S. Const. art. IV, § 4

Luther v. Borden, 48 U.S. (7 How.) 1 (1849), was a case in which the Supreme Court of the United States established the political question doctrine in controversies arising under the Guarantee Clause of Article Four of the United States Constitution (Art. IV, § 4).

Martin Luther was part of the Dorr Rebellion, an attempt to overthrow the charter government of Rhode Island that had stymied the efforts of those who wished to broaden the voting rights of state residents. The rebellion began as a political effort but turned violent. Martin Luther was arrested by Luther M. Borden, a state official, who searched his home and allegedly damaged his property. Luther contended that the charter government was not "republican" in nature because it restricted the electorate to only the most propertied classes; because Article Four states that "the United States shall guarantee to every State in this Union a Republican Form of Government," Luther argued that the Supreme Court should find that Borden acted without proper authority. In doing so, the Court would necessarily find that the "Dorrite" alternative republican government was the lawful government of Rhode Island, superseding the charter government.

== Court's decision ==
The Supreme Court found that it was up to the President and Congress to enforce this clause and that, as an inherently political question, it was outside the purview of the Court. The case was cited as justification for Congress' actions towards southern states in the post-Civil War Reconstruction Era.

The ruling established that the "republican form of government" clause of Article Four was non-justiciable, a ruling that still holds today. However, two decades after Luther v. Borden was decided, the Fourteenth Amendment, which included the Equal Protection Clause, was added to the Constitution. Baker v. Carr, in which the Court found that the Court could examine Tennessee's apportionment of legislative districts, was based on the Equal Protection Clause, and many subsequent cases that covered much of the same ground as Luther v. Borden followed suit.

== See also ==
- List of United States Supreme Court cases, volume 48
- Dorr Rebellion
- Judicial restraint
