= Guarantee Clause =

Clause of the United States Constitution

The Guarantee Clause, also known as the Republican Form of Government Clause, is in Article IV, Section 4 of the United States Constitution. It requires the United States to guarantee every state a republican form of government and provide protection from invasion and domestic violence.

== Text ==
Article IV, Section 4:

The United States shall guarantee to every State in this Union a Republican Form of Government, and shall protect each of them against Invasion; and on Application of the Legislature, or of the Executive (when the Legislature cannot be convened) against domestic Violence.

== History ==
The original substance of the clause was first proposed at the Constitutional Convention as part of the Virginia Plan, presented by Edmund Randolph.

The Guarantee Clause reflects a founding understanding of republicanism, which entails governing through electoral processes. As written in the Federalist No. 57: "The elective mode of obtaining rulers is the characteristic policy of republican government." Quoting Montesquieu, James Madison wrote in Federalist No. 43 that "should a popular insurrection happen in one of the States, the others are able to quell it. Should abuses creep into one part, they are reformed by those that remain sound."

At the time of the founding, however, states restricted the right to vote based on race, sex, and property ownership. Madison suggested that these existing practices in the states, which he called "existing republican forms", may be continued. Article I, Section 2 of the Constitution explicitly gave the states power to decide voting qualifications, although Article I, Section 4 gives Congress authority to regulate the time, place, and manner of federal elections.

Beginning in the aftermath of the Civil War, subsequent amendments broadened the right to vote and restricted discriminatory state laws. These include the Fifteenth (no denial of right to vote based on race), Nineteenth (no denial of right to vote based on sex), Twenty-Fourth (no poll tax), and the Twenty-Sixth Amendment (reducing the voting age to eighteen).

== Interpretation ==
It is understood that the Guarantee Clause requires states to produce governments by electoral processes, as opposed to inherited monarchies, dictatorships, or military rule.

=== Judicial interpretation ===
In cases such as Luther v. Borden (1849) and Pacific States Telephone and Telegraph Co. v. Oregon (1912), the Supreme Court held that the enforcement of the Guarantee Clause is a nonjusticiable political question, to be decided by Congress or the president instead of the courts.

Rhode Island was the only one of the Thirteen Colonies that did not adopt a constitution during the Revolutionary War period. Instead, it continued to rely on the 1663 royal charter issued by King Charles II, and restricted the franchise to men who owned more than $134 in land. A rival government attempted to adopt a constitution by convention but was quashed by the existing charter government. In Luther v. Borden, the Supreme Court refused to decide whether Rhode Island's charter government was illegitimate because of its limitations on voting rights.

In Pacific States Telephone & Telegraph Co. v. Oregon, the Supreme Court was asked to invalidate referendums (a form of direct democracy rather than representative democracy) permitted by state law, on the ground that they violate the Guarantee Clause's republican form of government requirement. The court refused to invalidate referendums.

Scholars have commented that these decisions are consistent with the statement in Federalist No. 43 that "States may choose to substitute other republican forms, they have a right to do so, and to claim the federal guaranty for the latter."

In Colegrove v. Green (1946), a challenge of state legislative apportionments, the Supreme Court declared that the Republican Form of Government Clause cannot be used as a basis to challenge state electoral malapportionment in court. However, the court clarified in Baker v. Carr (1962) that legislature malapportionment claims can be decided in court under the Equal Protection Clause of the Fourteenth Amendment, as the equal protection issue was separate from the Guarantee Clause challenge.

In 2019, the Supreme Court reiterated in Rucho v. Common Cause (a case about political gerrymandering) that the Guarantee Clause is not a justiciable issue capable of being litigated in court.

=== Congressional interpretation ===
Cases such as Luther v. Borden held the Guarantee Clause to be a political question to be resolved by Congress. Relying on that understanding, the Reconstruction era Congress disestablished ten state governments during peacetime and placed them under military rule. The law, known as the First Reconstruction Act, found those states to be unrepublican under the Guarantee Clause. The Supreme Court acquiesced to the disestablishment in Georgia v. Stanton (1868). Later, Congress also excluded elected legislators (a power recognized in Luther) when it faced "an election dispute created by state measures to suppress black voter turnout."

== See also ==
- Insurrection Act of 1807
- Section 119 of the Constitution of Australia, derived from the Guarantee Clause
