= Political question =

Legal doctrine of political matters' justiciability

In United States constitutional law, the political question doctrine holds that a constitutional dispute requiring or involving knowledge of a non-legal character, techniques not suitable for a court, or matters explicitly assigned by the Constitution to Legislative or Executive branches lies within the political realm, rather than the judiciary, which is apolitical by design. Judges customarily refuse to address such matters as a matter of justiciability, questioning whether their courts are an appropriate forum for the case. Legal questions are deemed justiciable, while political questions are nonjusticiable. One scholar explained:

The political question doctrine holds that some questions, in their nature, are fundamentally political, and not legal, and if a question is fundamentally political ... then the court will refuse to hear that case. It will claim that it doesn't have jurisdiction. And it will leave that question to some other aspect of the political process to settle out.

— John E. Finn, professor of government, 2006

A ruling of nonjusticiability prevents a case's core issue from being resolved in a court of law. When the issue involves duties not addressed by the Constitution, courts leave it to the democratic process, rather than resolving political disputes themselves.

== Origin ==
The doctrine can be traced to the landmark Supreme Court ruling in Marbury v. Madison (1803). In that case, Chief Justice John Marshall distinguished between the US Secretary of State's legal work and purely discretionary political tasks, only the former of which involves legally identifiable standards that can be reviewed by a court of law. Marshall argued that courts should generally not hear cases that involve political questions without implicating individual rights, though later decisions allowed the doctrine's application in cases that do implicate individual rights.

Former Associate Justice Stephen Breyer further traces this doctrine to the Roman statesman Cicero's observation that "when the cannons roar, the laws fall silent," such that politicians are granted leeway to violate the written law amid political emergencies like internal rebellion and external warfare. In Breyer's view, rather than making such political acts non-reviewable, the Constitution of the United States delegates that authority to Congress by empowering it to impeach presidents for violating their oath of office.

== Doctrine ==
Unlike the rules of standing, ripeness, and mootness, when the political question doctrine applies, a particular question is beyond judicial competence no matter who raises it, how immediate the interests it affects, or how burning the controversy. The doctrine is grounded in the separation of powers, as well as the federal judiciary's desire to avoid inserting itself into conflicts between branches of the federal government. It is justified as leaving political questions to the political process, in which voters can indirectly approve or reject the challenged action through voting.

The leading Supreme Court case on the political question doctrine is Baker v. Carr (1962). In that case, the Supreme Court held that an unequal apportionment of a state legislature may have denied equal protection and presented a justiciable issue. In Baker, the Court outlined six characteristics "[p]rominent on the surface of any case held to involve a political question":

- "a textually demonstrable constitutional commitment of the issue to a coordinate political department; or
- a lack of judicially discoverable and manageable standards for resolving it; or
- the impossibility of deciding without an initial policy determination of a kind clearly for nonjudicial discretion; or
- the impossibility of a court's undertaking independent resolution without expressing a lack of respect for coordinate branches of government; or
- an unusual need for unquestioning adherence to a political decision already made; or
- the potentiality of embarrassment from multifarious pronouncements by various departments on one question."

The first factor—a textually demonstrable commitment to another branch—is the classical view that the Court must decide all cases and issues before it unless, as a matter of constitutional interpretation, the Constitution itself commits the issue to another branch of government. The second and third factors—lack of judicially discoverable standards and involvement of the judiciary in nonjudicial policy determinations—suggest a functional approach, based on practical considerations of how government ought to work. The final three factors—lack of respect for other branches, need for adherence to a political decision already made, and possibility of embarrassment—are based on the Court's prudential consideration against overexertion or aggrandizement.

== Other applications ==
While the scope of the political question doctrine is still unsettled, its application has been mostly settled in a few decided areas. These areas are:

=== Guarantee Clause ===
The Guarantee Clause of the US Constitution requires the federal government to "guarantee to every State in this Union a Republican Form of Government." The Supreme Court has ruled that this clause does not imply any set of "judicially manageable standards which a court could utilize independently in order to identify a State's lawful government." On this ground, the Court refused to identify the legitimate government of Rhode Island during the Dorr Rebellion in Luther v. Borden (1849). Since then, the Court has consistently refused to resort to the Guarantee Clause as a constitutional source for invalidating state action, such as whether it is lawful for states to adopt laws through referendums.

=== Impeachment ===
Article I, Section 2 of the Constitution states that the House "shall have the sole power of Impeachment," and Article I, Section 3 provides that the "Senate shall have the sole Power to try all Impeachments." Since the Constitution placed the sole power of impeachment in two political bodies, it is qualified as a political question. As a result, neither the decision of the House to impeach, nor of the Senate to remove a President or any other official, can be appealed to any court.

=== Foreign policy, national security and war ===
A court will not usually decide if a treaty has been terminated because "governmental action [...] must be regarded as of controlling importance." However, courts sometimes do rule on the issue. One example of this is native American tribes who have been officially terminated do not lose their treaty concessions without explicit text from Congress that the treaty is also abrogated.

In the case of bin Ali Jaber v. United States (2017), the plaintiffs filed a lawsuit under the Torture Victim Protection Act of 1991 after a 2012 US drone strike killed five civilians. The District of Columbia Court of Appeals dismissed the plaintiffs' claims on the basis that the "plaintiffs challenged the type of executive decision found nonjusticiable in El-Shifa Pharmaceutical Industries Co. v. United States (2010)." In El-Shifa, the court distinguished "between claims questioning the wisdom of military action, 'a policy choice . . . constitutionally committed' to the political branches, and 'legal issues such as whether the government had legal authority to act.'" Thus, the court held that the plaintiffs' argument required the court to make a policy decision.

=== Gerrymandering ===
In cases like Davis v. Bandemer (1986), Vieth v. Jubelirer (2004), and Gill v. Whitford (2018), the Supreme Court had repeatedly treated partisan gerrymandering as judiciable, but it remained unable to agree on a majority standard for deciding such cases. In Rucho v. Common Cause (2019), the Supreme Court ultimately reversed itself, deciding that partisan gerrymandering was a purely political question.

=== Private military contractors ===
In the case of Ghane v. Mid-South (January 16, 2014), the Mississippi Supreme Court held that a wrongful death action against a private military company by the family of a deceased United States Navy SEAL could proceed under Mississippi law since the plaintiff's claims did not present a non-justiciable political question under Baker v. Carr (1962).

== Court cases ==
US Supreme Court cases discussing the political question doctrine:

- Marbury v. Madison, 5 U.S. (1 Cranch) 137 (1803) – Origin of the phrase.
- Luther v. Borden, 48 U.S. 1 (1849) – Guarantee of a republican form of government is a political question.
- Coleman v. Miller, 307 U.S. 433 (1939) – Mode of amending federal Constitution is a political question.
- Colegrove v. Green, 328 U.S. 549 (1946) – Apportionment of congressional districts is a political question (Overruled by Baker v. Carr).
- Baker v. Carr, 369 U.S. 186 (1962) – Apportionment – whether of state or federal legislatures – is not a political question.
- Powell v. McCormack, 395 U.S. 486 (1969) – Congress' exclusion of members who have met the qualifications to serve is not a political question.
- Goldwater v. Carter, 444 U.S. 996 (1979) – Presidential authority to terminate treaties is a political question.
- INS v. Chadha, 462 U.S. 919 (1983) – Constitutionality of one house legislative veto is not a political question.
- Nixon v. United States, 506 U.S. 224 (1993) – Senate authority over impeachment is a political question.
- Rucho v. Common Cause, 588 U.S. 684 (2019) – Partisan gerrymandering is a political question.

== International use ==
=== France ===
French administrative law recognizes a narrow category of executive measures, known as actes de gouvernement, that are not subject to judicial review. The doctrine now covers two categories: measures concerning relations among constitutional authorities and measures inseparable from France's foreign relations. Examples include dissolving the National Assembly, resuming nuclear weapons testing, and suspending foreign aid.

=== Israel ===
Israeli courts address political questions through the doctrine of justiciability. In Ressler v. Minister of Defence (1988), the Supreme Court of Israel, sitting as the High Court of Justice, distinguished between "normative justiciability", whether legal standards exist for deciding a dispute, and "institutional justiciability", whether a court is the appropriate institution to decide it. Justice Aharon Barak concluded that the political character of a dispute does not by itself place the legality of government action beyond judicial review. President Meir Shamgar, concurring, stated that a court may decline review where a dispute's political character predominates over its legal aspects.

The Court has nonetheless applied institutional nonjusticiability in some cases. In Bargil v. Government of Israel (1993), it dismissed a general challenge to the government's settlement policy because the petition concerned policy within the authority of other branches, did not present a concrete dispute, and was predominantly political. The Court stressed that this did not bar review of concrete disputes concerning settlements.

In Ornan v. Ministry of the Interior (2013), the Court restated the dominant character test and surveyed cases applying it to another challenge to settlement policy, peace negotiations with Syria, the signing of the Oslo Accords, a prisoner exchange, a freeze on settlement construction in the West Bank, and an internal parliamentary procedure. The Court held that the appellants' request to have their nationality recorded as "Israeli" in the population registry was justiciable, but denied relief because they had not justified departing from the Court's earlier decision in Tamrin v. State of Israel.

=== Japan ===
The postwar constitution gave the Supreme Court of Japan the power of judicial review. The court developed its own political question doctrine (Japanese: 統治行為; tōchikōi), in part to avoid interpreting Article 9 of the post-war pacifist constitution, which renounces war and the threat or use of force. Issues arising under Article 9 have included include the legitimacy of Japan's Self-Defense Force, the Treaty of Mutual Cooperation and Security between the United States and Japan, and the stationing of American forces in Japan.

The Sunagawa case is considered the leading precedent on the political question doctrine in Japan. In 1957, demonstrators entered a then-American military base in the Tokyo suburb of Sunagawa, violating a special Japanese criminal law based on the US-Japan Security Treaty. A Tokyo District Court found that the US military's presence in Japan were unconstitutional under Article 9 of the Constitution and acquitted the defendants. The Japanese Supreme Court overturned the district court in a fast-track appeal, implicitly developing the political question doctrine in the ruling. The Court found it inappropriate for the judiciary to judge the constitutionality of highly political matters like the US-Japan Security Treaty, unless they expressly violate the Constitution. On the Security Treaty, the Court saw "an extremely high degree of political consideration," and "there is a certain element of incompatibility in the process of judicial determination of its constitutionality by a court of law which has as its mission the exercise of the purely judicial function." It therefore found that the question should be resolved by the Cabinet, Diet, and people through elections. The presence of American forces was held to not violate Article 9 because they were not under Japanese command. The political question doctrine has remained a barrier for challenges under Article 9. Under the "clear mistake" rule developed by the Court, it defers to the political branches on Article 9 issues so long as the act is "not obviously unconstitutional and void."

Other notable cases on the political question doctrine in Japan include the Tomabechi case, which concerned whether the dissolution of the Diet was valid. In the Tomabechi case, the Court also decided against judicial review by implicitly invoking the political question doctrine, citing the separation of powers as justification. In addition, the Court announced that in political question cases not related to Article 9, the clear mistake rule does not apply and judicial review is categorically prohibited.

=== Philippines ===
In Avelino v. Cuenco, the Supreme Court of the Philippines refused to rule on who between José Avelino and Mariano Cuenco was the legitimate president of the Senate of the Philippines, thus denying Avelino's quo warranto petition questioning Cuenco's election.

=== Switzerland ===
In 2007, Taiwan filed a lawsuit before a Swiss civil court against the International Organization for Standardization, arguing that the ISO's use of the United Nations name "Taiwan, Province of China" rather than "Republic of China (Taiwan)" violated Taiwan's name rights. On 9 September 2010, a panel of the Federal Supreme Court of Switzerland decided, by three votes to two, to dismiss the suit as presenting a political question not subject to Swiss civil jurisdiction.

=== Taiwan ===
In November 1993, the Judicial Yuan, the judicial branch of Taiwan, interpreted that the delimitation of national territory would be a significant political question beyond the reach of judicial review.

=== International law ===
The International Court of Justice has dealt with the doctrine in its advisory function, and the European Court of Human Rights has engaged with the doctrine through the margin of appreciation. The Court of Justice of the European Union has never explicitly addressed the political question doctrine in its jurisprudence, yet it has been argued that there are traces of the doctrine present in its rulings.

== See also ==
- Judicial activism
