= New York Catholic Protectory =

Orphanage in New York City (1871–1938)

The New York Catholic Protectory was a Catholic orphanage in the Bronx, New York City, founded in 1863 by the Society for the Protection of Destitute Roman Catholic Children in the City of New York ("The Society"). The Society's founding was an important development for Catholic child placements in the United States. By 1900, it was the largest child welfare organization in the country. It received official state recognition in 1871 and closed in 1938.

== History ==
The Society the Protection of Destitute Roman Catholic Children was a group of twenty-five Catholic men from Irish backgrounds who were concerned with the growing number of poor children in their community. By the mid 1860s, many children in New York City were the offspring of immigrants living in squalid and disease-ridden neighborhoods. Adding to the destitution was that casualties of the Civil War left many women widows and their children fatherless. The Society later chartered in 1863 to provide institutional care for "idle, truant, vicious or homeless children between the ages of seven and fourteen, committed by any legally authorized magistrate in New York City." According to Janet Butler Munch, "[the Protectory] effectively served as a safety net for children and families in need. The goal was not long-term commitments for children but return to their families when conditions stabilized. The Protectory accepted more children than most other institutions at that time, but mainly accepted minors under age fourteen committed either by their parents, by juvenile court judges, or the city's poor officials.

The Catholic Protectory was organized as a response to growing concern about the proselytizing activities of larger Protestant groups, prompting supporters of the Catholic Church to involve itself in child welfare services. The former Episcopal Bishop of North Carolina, Levi Silliman Ives, the founder and first president of the Catholic Protectory, was a major proponent for the founding of the Catholic Protcetory. Ives and his supporters supporters established the Protectory after an unsuccessful attempt to create a Catholic placing out agency to rival Charles Loring Brace's Protestant-run Children's Aid Society (CAS).

The Protectory began with two buildings on 36th and 37th Streets in Manhattan, for boys under the care of the Christian Brothers, a congregation founded in France, in the first quarter of the eighteenth century, by St. John Baptiste de la Salle for the training and correction of wayward youth. Many of the boys received had been adjudicated truants. The Boys Department subsequently relocated to 86th Street and Fifth Ave.

In October 1863, a building at the corner of 86th Street and Second Avenue was secured for girls and placed under the direction of the Sisters of Charity. This proving too small, a forty-acre farm was purchased in Westchester and a new building erected in 1859. The sisters took care of all the girls, and any boys under ten years of age; the brothers had charge of the older boys. Unlike many similar institutions, the Protectory provided training in skills that would allow its charges to make a living upon leaving. It was felt that vocational studies should not be postponed until mature years, but should be commenced early, so as to accustom the boy to what may afterwards prove to be the means of earning his own livelihood when he shall have left the Protectory. The boys learned printing in all its branches, photography, tailoring, shoemaking, laundry work, industrial and ornamental drawing, sign-painting, blacksmithing, plumbing, carpentry, bricklaying, stone-work, baking in its different branches, and in practical knowledge of boilers, engines, dynamos and electric wiring. The girls learned to embroider, cook and make gloves, typewriting, and stenography. According to Munch, "The boys handled all maintenance work on the property including painting, carpentry, masonry, bricklaying, and electrical work." The boys from different trades would make up sports teams to compete with one another. In 1865, the Protectory purchased the William Varian 114 acre farm in Westchester near St. Raymond's Church. A school and dormitories were built. The institution was an integral part of the parish until it was sold in 1938.

A development with the greatest impact to New York Protectory's history happened in the mid-1870s. A year after adopting a constitutional amendment that prohibited the state of New York from subsidizing privately-run organizations, the New York legislature passed the Act to Provide for the Better Care of Pauper or Destitute Children, also known as the "Children's Law," in 1875. The Children's Law played a central part in the growth and rapid expansion of the Protectory because it provided for a weekly per capita subsidy to institutions caring for children, and it included a religious clause requiring children to be committed to an institution “that is governed or controlled by officers or persons of the same religious faith as the parents of such child, as far as practicable.” The law, with its special attention to children’s religious identities, had the effect of significantly increasing the number of Catholic children from poorhouses to Catholic-run orphanages. By the 1890s, Catholic orphanages in New York held 80% of the state's dependent children, while Jews and Protestants held a 10% share each.

By 1878, the Protectory was serving over 3,000 children annually. In 1904, a Protectory Band played "Garry Owen" at Theodore Roosevelt's presidential inauguration in Washington. In 1920, the Lincoln Giants, a professional Negro league baseball team from Harlem moved from their old home park, Olympic Field (at Fifth Avenue and 136th Street), to the Catholic Protectory Oval in the Bronx.

The Protectory closed in 1938.
