= Puerto Rico v. Branstad =

1987 United States Supreme Court case

- Supreme Court of the United States

Argued March 30, 1987 Decided June 23, 1987
- Full case name: Puerto Rico v. Terry Branstad, Governor of Iowa, et al.
- Citations: 483 U.S. 219 (more) 107 S. Ct. 2802; 97 L. Ed. 2d 187; 1987 U.S. LEXIS 2873; 55 U.S.L.W. 4975

Case history
- Prior: Dismissed, S.D. Iowa; affirmed, 787 F.2d 423 (8th Cir. 1986); cert. granted, 479 U.S. 811 (1986).

Holding
- Federal courts have the power to enforce extraditions under the Extradition Clause.

Court membership
- Chief Justice William Rehnquist Associate Justices William J. Brennan Jr. · Byron White; Thurgood Marshall · Harry Blackmun; Lewis F. Powell Jr. · John P. Stevens; Sandra Day O'Connor · Antonin Scalia

Case opinions
- Majority: Marshall, joined by Rehnquist, Brennan, White, Blackmun, Stevens; Powell, O'Connor (parts I, II-A, II-C, III); Scalia (in part)
- Concurrence: O'Connor (in part), joined by Powell
- Concurrence: Scalia (in part)

Laws applied
- U.S. Const. art. IV § 2 Extradition Act 18 U.S.C. § 3182
- This case overturned a previous ruling or rulings
- Kentucky v. Dennison (1861)

Puerto Rico v. Branstad, 483 U.S. 219 (1987), was a case decided by the Supreme Court of the United States that ruled unanimously that federal courts have the power to enforce extraditions based on the Extradition Clause of Article Four of the United States Constitution. The decision overruled a 1861 decision in Kentucky v. Dennison, which had made federal courts powerless to order governors of other U.S. states to fulfill their obligations in the Extradition Clause.

== Background ==
The Extradition Clause, in Article IV, Section 2, of the United States Constitution reads:

A Person charged in any State with Treason, Felony, or other Crime, who shall flee from Justice, and be found in another State, shall on demand of the executive Authority of the State from which he fled, be delivered up, to be removed to the State having Jurisdiction of the Crime.

Congress also legislated the Extradition Act, 18 U.S.C. § 3182, which effectively reads the same as the Extradition Clause except to include territories, Washington, D.C., and the states as well.

The Supreme Court had held in Kentucky v. Dennison (1861), before the American Civil War, that the federal courts may not issue writs of mandamus to compel state governors to surrender fugitives.

On 25 January 1981, Iowa native Ronald Calder struck a Puerto Rican couple, Antonio de Jesus and his wife Amy Villalba de Jesus, with his car in a grocery store parking lot near Aguadilla, Puerto Rico, following what was reportedly a dispute over scraped fenders. Antonio de Jesus survived the attack but Amy, who was eight months pregnant, died shortly afterwards. Witnesses testified that Calder, after striking the couple, backed his car two or three times over the victim's body. Calder claimed that de Jesus had threatened him with an iron bar and that he had accidentally run over de Jesus's wife whilst attempting to flee.

Calder was arrested and charged with first-degree homicide by Puerto Rican authorities and was released after paying $5,000 bail. However, Calder did not appear at two preliminary hearings that were scheduled in the Puerto Rico District Courts, and he was then declared a fugitive of justice. The Puerto Rican authorities notified the police in Iowa because they had suspicions that he had fled to his home state. In April 1981, Calder surrendered to the police in Polk County, Iowa, but was released after he had posted the $20,000 bail that had been set by an Iowa District Court magistrate.

In May 1981, the governor of Puerto Rico, Carlos Romero Barceló, submitted to the governor of Iowa, Robert D. Ray, a request for extradition. The request for extradition was referred to an extradition hearing at which Calder's counsel testified that "a white American man could not receive a fair trial in the Commonwealth of Puerto Rico."

After failed attempts were made to negotiate a reduction in charges against Calder, Ray wrote, in December 1981, to Barceló that in the absence of a "change to a more realistic charge," the request for extradition was denied. Another extradition request was made to Ray's successor, Terry Branstad, but was also denied.

In February 1984, the Commonwealth of Puerto Rico filed a petition for a writ of mandamus in the United States District Court for the Southern District of Iowa to order Branstad to proceed with the extradition of Calder. Branstad argued that the Extradition Clause did not apply to Puerto Rico because the island was not a U.S. state. Furthermore, he claimed that Puerto Rico could not invoke the Extradition Act because the federal courts, under Kentucky v. Dennison, did not have the power to order governors to follow the Extradition Clause or Act. The District Court agreed and dismissed the case. The United States Court of Appeals for the Eighth Circuit affirmed.

== Decision ==
Justice Marshall delivered the Court's opinion. It concluded that the precedent established by Kentucky v. Dennison was "the product of another time. The conception of the relation between the States and the Federal Government there announced is fundamentally incompatible with more than a century of constitutional development."

The Supreme Court, therefore, established the power of federal courts to enforce both the Extradition Clause and the Extradition Act by writs of mandamus.

One point that arose during oral argument was whether the Extradition Clause applied to Puerto Rico since it is not a U.S. state. Although Justice Marshall, joined by five other Justices, analyzed Puerto Rico's current political condition as one that gives Puerto Rico certain rights comparable to those of the U.S. states, he applied in the end the Extradition Act, which clearly includes U.S. territories. Justice O'Connor noted that fact in her concurrence and did not join the opinion of the Court regarding Puerto Rico's status.

Justice Scalia also did not join that section of the opinion and noted that "no party before us has asserted the lack of power of Congress to require extradition from a State to a Territory."

The decision effectively overruled Kentucky v. Dennison and reversed the judgments of the Eighth Circuit and the Southern District of Iowa.

== Aftermath ==
Following the ruling, Calder voluntarily returned to Puerto Rico in September 1987 to face charges of murder and attempted murder. These were dismissed by the trial judge and Calder instead pleaded guilty in January 1988 to voluntary manslaughter and attempted manslaughter. He was given 16 and 5-year suspended sentences and permitted to return to Iowa on 15-years' probation. After his return, he was rehired by the Federal Aviation Administration and worked there until his retirement. He died in May 2015 in Des Moines, aged 75.

This case regained significance after Ron DeSantis, the governor of Florida, stated that the state of Florida would not cooperate with any extradition of Trump to New York in response to the March 2023 indictment of Donald Trump.

== See also ==
- List of United States Supreme Court cases, volume 483
- List of United States Supreme Court cases
- Lists of United States Supreme Court cases by volume
- List of United States Supreme Court cases by the Rehnquist Court
- Rendition
- Federalism
