= Ardeth =

Ardeth or Ardith may refer to:

- Ardeth G. Kapp (1931–2024), the ninth general president of the Young Women Organization of The Church of Jesus Christ of Latter-day Saints (LDS Church) from 1984 to 1992
- Ardeth Platte (1936–2020), American Dominican Religious Sister and anti-nuclear activist
- Ardeth Wood (1975–2003), Canadian woman who was a graduate student at the University of Waterloo who was killed in a forcible drowning in the city of Ottawa
- Ardith McPherson, American female deputy constable who worked in Texas' Harris County Constable's office
- Ardith Melloh, Swedish female author of the 1981 book Grandfather's Songbooks, Or, The Psalmodikon in America
- Ardith Dondanville Todd, American actress who played a character in the 1939 film The Wizard of Oz

== Fictional characters ==
- Ardeth Bay, a fictional male character who has appeared in The Mummy movie series
- Ardeth, the ex wife of Jay Sherman in the cartoon The Critic

== See also ==
- Ardeth Lake, an alpine lake in Boise County, Idaho, United States
- Ardeth Lake (California), a lake in Tuolumne County, California
