= Rendition (law) =

Transfer of persons or property from one jurisdiction to another

In law, rendition is a "surrender" or "handing over" of persons or property, particularly from one jurisdiction to another. For criminal suspects, extradition is the most common type of rendition. Rendition can also be seen as the act of handing over, after the request for extradition has taken place.

Rendition can also mean the act of rendering, i.e. delivering, a judicial decision, or of explaining a series of events, as a defendant or witness. It can also mean the execution of a judicial order by the directed parties. Extraordinary rendition is distinct from both deportation and extradition, being inherently illegal.

Rendition is necessary as a consequence of the problems created by transnational crime.

== United States ==
=== Interstate rendition ===
Rendition between states is required by Article Four, Section Two of the United States Constitution; this section is often termed the rendition clause.

Each state has a presumptive duty to render suspects on the request of another state, as under the full faith and credit clause. The Supreme Court has established certain exceptions; a state may allow its own legal proceedings against a suspect to take precedence, for example. It was established in Kentucky v. Dennison that interstate rendition and extradition were not a federal writ; that is, a state could not petition the federal courts to have another state honor its request for rendition, if the state receiving the request chose not to do so. If the State failed to request federal intervention, but relied on other argument for the rendition, the Hatfield/McCoy feud produced the case of Mahon v. Justice, holding there is "no comity between the states by which a person held upon an indictment for a criminal offense in one state can be turned over to the authorities of another state, although abducted from the latter." The Uniform Extradition Act may nullify this result in those States that have adopted it.

In rare cases, usually involving the death penalty, states have refused or delayed rendition. In 1987, this was overturned by Puerto Rico v. Branstad, so a federal interest in resolving interstate rendition disputes was established. Nevertheless, the right of refusal of rendition was not overturned.

Extradition for fugitives who are charged with a crime is commonly requested by state or county prosecutors. Formal interstate rendition will involve both state governors. Other procedures can involve waiving documentary formalities before surrender of the fugitive. Under the Uniform Extradition Act adopted in 48 states, Puerto Rico and the Virgin Islands (but not in Mississippi and South Carolina), there is a distinction between fugitives who were in the demanding state at the time of the crime and those nonfugitives whose prior presence is not so alleged. The first type is mandatory under the United States Constitution. The less frequent second type allows for some Gubernatorial discretion. These cases can involve bad checks or failure to pay child support but they still must be criminal matters.

Bounty hunters and bondsmen once had unlimited authority to capture fugitives, even outside the state where they were wanted by the courts. When they deliver such a person, this is considered rendition, as it did not involve the intervention of the justice system in the state of capture. Under more recent law, bounty hunters are not legally permitted to act outside of the state where the offense took place, but cases of rendition still take place due to the financial interest the bondsmen have in returning a fugitive and recovering from the bail bond forfeiture. Formally, such fugitive cases should be turned over to the state for execution under the Uniform Criminal Extradition Act (1936) and the Uniform Extradition and Rendition Act (1980), if the fugitive's location is known, or the United States Marshals Service, when it is not.

In the State of California, before attempting to apprehend a bail fugitive who has fled bail from another state, a bounty hunter or bail bondsman must adhere to the provisions set forth in California Penal Code Section 847.5.

Rendition was infamously used to recapture fugitive slaves, who under the Constitution and various federal laws had virtually no human rights. As the movement for abolition grew, Northern states increasingly refused to comply or cooperate with rendition of escaped slaves, leading to the Fugitive Slave Law of 1850. This non-cooperation was behind the longstanding principle of refusal, only reverted in the 1987 decision.

=== Irregular rendition ===
This type of rendition is defined as extrajudicial abduction or detention of an individual from a foreign state to another state for the purposes of criminal jurisdiction. American use of "irregular rendition" is a familiar alternative to extradition, and it is the same process as extraordinary rendition. It involves kidnapping or deceit. In the view of the United States, kidnapping a defendant overseas and returning him to the United States for trial does not remove jurisdiction from American courts unless an applicable extradition treaty explicitly calls for that result.

==== Example cases ====
This is a non-exhaustive list of some alleged examples of irregular rendition.

- John Surratt, 1866: The United States exercised extraterritorial jurisdiction over John Surratt, a possible co-conspirator in the assassination of President Abraham Lincoln. Law enforcement officers returned Surratt to the United States in 1866 after he had fled to Alexandria, Egypt.
- Frederick Ker, 1886: A Pinkerton agent, Henry Julian, was hired by the federal government to collect larcenist Frederick Ker, who had fled to Peru. Although Julian had the necessary extradition papers, he found that there was no official to meet his request due to the recent Chilean military occupation of Lima. Rather than return home empty-handed, Julian kidnapped the fugitive, with assistance from Chilean forces, and placed him on a U.S. vessel heading back to the United States.
- Shirley Collins, 1952: Was abducted from a bus station in Chicago, Illinois due to being a suspect in a murder case in Michigan. The authorities from Michigan went to Illinois and forcibly abducted the defendant to take him back to Michigan to get tried for the murder. He claimed that he was forcibly seized, handcuffed and blackjacked (being hit by a short leather club) by the Chicago authorities. Upon being taken to the Chicago police department he was denied counsel and blackjacked again when he refused to return to Michigan to be tried, this time it was by the Michigan and Chicago authorities.
- Francisco Toscanino, 1974: Francisco Toscanino was forcibly abducted from Italy and taken back to the US, due to being accused of intent to smuggle narcotics into the United States. Uruguayan police forcibly abducted the Italian and gave him to the American authorities.
- Julio Juventino Lujan, 1975: In Lujan, the defendant was abducted in a foreign country and brought to the United States to face prosecution for a narcotics violation. Lujan attacked the court's jurisdiction over his person based upon the manner in which he was apprehended.
- Dan Davis, 2007: Dan Davis was a fugitive from the United States for more than 10 years when he was kidnapped in Venezuela by paramilitary forces and turned over to the United States Homeland Security at the airport and flown to Miami and turned over to the US Marshals Service for sentencing from his original drug charges.

=== Extraordinary rendition ===
Human rights groups charge that extraordinary rendition is a violation of Article 3 of the United Nations Convention Against Torture (UNCAT), because suspects are taken to countries where torture during interrogation remains common, thus circumventing the protections the captives would enjoy in the United States or nations who abide by the terms of UNCAT. Its legality remains highly controversial, as the United States outlaws the use of torture, and the U.S. Constitution guarantees due process. Rendered suspects are denied due process because they are arrested without charges, deprived of legal counsel, and illegally transferred to a third world country with the intent and purpose of facilitating torture and other interrogation measures which would be illegal in the USA.

== Other uses ==
Two "reform school" groups, the Aspen Education Group and WWASP, have been accused of using a contractor to kidnap teenagers from their homes or in public, to transport them to facilities around the world. Many of the youth who spent time in these schools have spoken of being abducted during the night, while outside with friends, and (in one case) staying at their boyfriend's house. The most famous of these companies is called Strawn Support Services and has agents working in every state of the US as well as in Latin American countries where WWASP schools are located. These agents often carry weapons such as tasers, mace, and occasionally firearms during transports.

== See also ==
- Ratlines
- Priest shuffling
- Gypsy cop
- Legal immunity
- Impunity
