= Extradition law in the United States =

In the United States, extradition law is a collection of federal laws that regulate extradition, the formal process by which a fugitive found in the United States is surrendered to another country or state for trial, punishment, or rehabilitation.

For foreign countries, the extradition process is regulated by treaty and conducted between the federal government of the United States and the government of a foreign country. International extradition is considerably different from interstate or intrastate extradition. If requested by the charging state, US states and territories must extradite anyone charged with a felony, misdemeanor, or even petty offense in another US state or territory, even if the offense is not a crime in the custodial state. The federal government of the United States is a separate jurisdiction from the states with limited scope, but has nationwide law enforcement presence.

== Interstate extradition ==
The Extradition Clause in the US Constitution requires states, upon demand of another state, to deliver a fugitive from justice who has committed a "treason, felony or other crime" to the state from which the fugitive has fled. 18 U.S.C. § 3182 sets the process by which an executive of a state, district, or territory of the United States must arrest and turn over a fugitive from another state, district, or territory.

For a person to be extradited interstate, 18 U.S.C. § 3182 requires:

- An executive authority demand of the jurisdiction to which a person that is a fugitive from justice has fled.
- The requesting executive must also produce a copy of an indictment found or an affidavit made before a magistrate of any state or territory. The document must charge the fugitive demanded with having committed treason, felony, or other crime, and it must be certified as authentic by the governor or chief magistrate of the state or territory from where the person so charged has fled.
- The executive receiving the request must then cause the fugitive to be arrested and secure and to notify the requesting executive authority or agent to receive the fugitive.
- An agent of the executive of the state demanding extradition must appear to receive the prisoner, which must occur within 30 days from time of arrest, or the prisoner may be released. Some states allow longer waiting periods, of up to 90 days.
- Cases of kidnapping by a parent to another state see automatic involvement by the US Marshals Service.

In Kentucky v. Dennison, decided in 1860, the Supreme Court held that, although the governor of the asylum state had a constitutional duty to return a fugitive to the demanding state, the federal courts had no authority to enforce this duty. As a result, for more than 100 years, the governor of one state was deemed to have discretion on whether or not to comply with another state's request for extradition.

In a 1987 case, Puerto Rico v. Branstad, the court overruled Dennison, and held that the governor of the asylum state has no discretion in performing his or her duty to extradite, whether that duty arises under the Extradition Clause of the Constitution or under the Extradition Act (18 U.S.C. § 3182), and that a federal court may enforce the governor's duty to return the fugitive to the demanding state. There are only four grounds upon which the governor of the asylum state may deny another state's request for extradition:

1. the extradition documents facially are not in order;
2. the person has not been charged with a crime in the demanding state;
3. the person is not the person named in the extradition documents; or
4. the person is not a fugitive.

There appears to be at least one additional exception: if the fugitive is under sentence in the asylum state, he need not be extradited until his punishment in the asylum state is completed.

As of 2010, in practice, Alaska and Hawaii typically do not request extradition if the crime in question is not a felony because of the associated costs of transporting the suspect and the housing fees that must be paid to the jurisdiction in which the accused is held until transported.

South Carolina, Mississippi, and Louisiana have not adopted the Uniform Criminal Extradition Act, but have adopted other extradition laws.

== Intrastate extradition ==
Intrastate extradition may be necessary if a fugitive is arrested by a local police force (such as for a county, city, or college) in the same state or territory as the offense was allegedly committed. The procedure for doing so depends on state and possibly local laws.

== International extradition ==
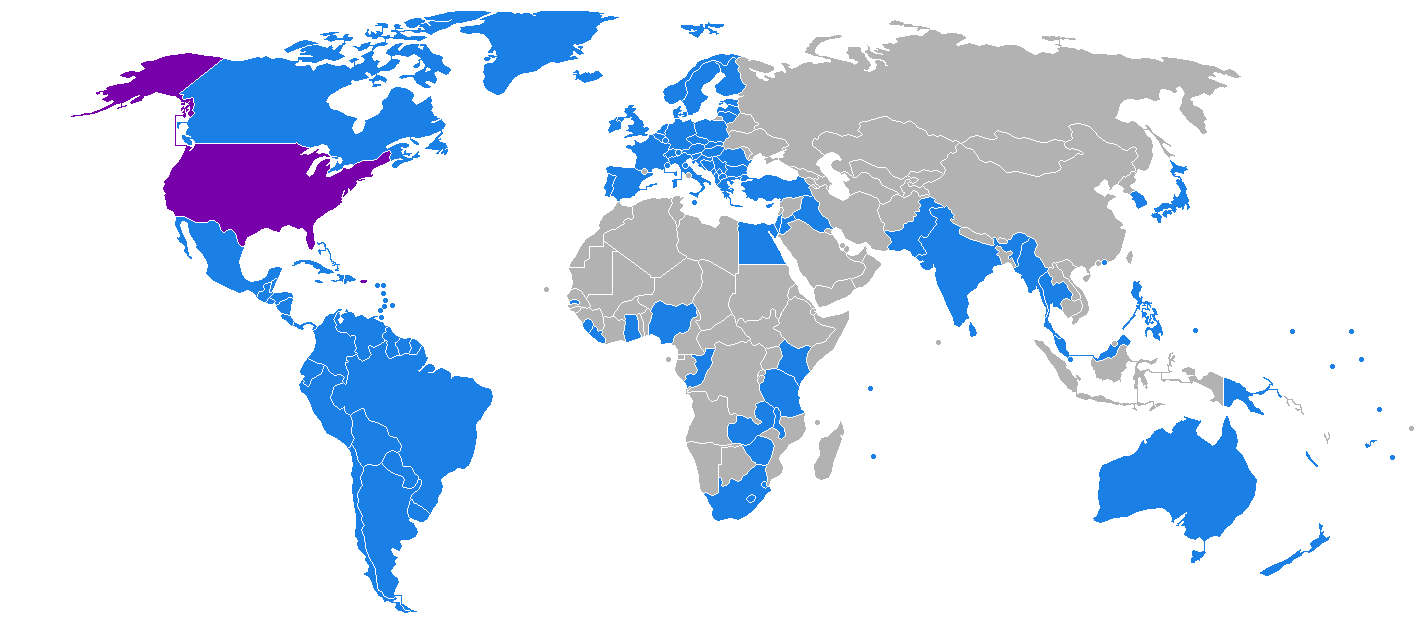
The United States (shown in purple) has extradition treaties with the countries shown in blue

As of 2022, the United States has extradition treaties with 116 countries. Most of them are dual criminality treaties (extradition for actions considered crimes in both countries), with the remaining being list treaties (extradition for a specific list of crimes).

The United States does not have extradition treaties with the following countries that it recognizes as sovereign states:

- Afghanistan
- Algeria
- Andorra
- Angola
- Armenia
- Azerbaijan
- Bahrain
- Bangladesh
- Belarus
- Benin
- Bhutan
- Botswana
- Brunei
- Burkina Faso
- Burundi
- Cambodia
- Cameroon
- Cape Verde
- Central African Republic
- Chad
- China
  (extradition to Hong Kong was suspended in 2020)
  (Macao)
- Comoros
- Democratic Republic of the Congo
- Djibouti
- East Timor
- Equatorial Guinea
- Eritrea
- Ethiopia
- Gabon
- Georgia
- Guinea
- Guinea-Bissau
- Indonesia
- Iran
- Ivory Coast
- Kazakhstan
- Kuwait
- Kyrgyzstan
- Laos
- Lebanon
- Libya
- Madagascar
- Maldives
- Mali
- Mauritania
- Moldova
- Mongolia
- Morocco
- Mozambique
- Namibia
- Nepal
- Niger
- North Korea
- Oman
- Qatar
- Russia
- Rwanda
- Samoa
- São Tomé and Príncipe
- Saudi Arabia
- Senegal
- Solomon Islands
- Somalia
- South Sudan
- Sudan
- Syria
- Tajikistan
- Togo
- Tunisia
- Turkmenistan
- Uganda
- Ukraine
- United Arab Emirates
- Uzbekistan
- Vanuatu
- Vatican City
- Vietnam
- Yemen

The United States does not have extradition treaties with the following polities that it also does not recognize as sovereign states:

- Abkhazia
- Northern Cyprus
- Palestine
- Somaliland
- South Ossetia
- Taiwan
- Transnistria
- Western Sahara

=== Extradition from the United States ===
Generally under United States law (18 U.S.C. § 3184), extradition may be granted only pursuant to a treaty. Some countries grant extradition without a treaty, but every such country requires an offer of reciprocity when extradition is accorded in the absence of a treaty. Further, the 1996 amendments to 18 U.S.C. 3181 and 3184 permit the United States to extradite, without regard to the existence of a treaty, persons (other than citizens, nationals or permanent residents of the United States) who have committed crimes of violence against nationals of the United States in foreign countries.

All extradition treaties in force require foreign requests for extradition to be submitted through diplomatic channels, usually from the country's embassy in Washington to the Department of State. Many treaties also require that requests for provisional arrest be submitted through diplomatic channels, although some permit provisional arrest requests to be sent directly to the Department of Justice. The Department of State reviews foreign extradition demands to identify any potential foreign policy problems and to ensure that there is a treaty in force between the United States and the country making the request, that the crime or crimes are extraditable offenses, and that the supporting documents are properly certified in accordance with 18 U.S.C. § 3190. If the request is in proper order, an attorney in the State Department's Office of the Legal Adviser prepares a certificate attesting to the existence of the treaty, that the crime or crimes are extraditable offenses, and that the supporting documents are properly certified in accordance with 18 U.S.C. § 3190, and forwards it with the original request to the Justice Department's Office of International Affairs (OIA).

Once the OIA receives a foreign extradition request, it reviews the request for sufficiency and forwards sufficient requests to the United States Attorney's Office for the judicial district in which the fugitive is located. The U.S. Attorney's office then obtains a warrant, and the fugitive is arrested and brought before the magistrate judge or the US district judge. The government opposes bond in extradition cases. Unless the fugitive waives his or her right to a hearing, the court will hold a hearing pursuant to 18 U.S.C. § 3184 to determine whether the fugitive is extraditable. If the court finds the fugitive to be extraditable, it enters an order of extraditability and certifies the record to the Secretary of State, who decides whether to surrender the fugitive to the requesting government. OIA notifies the foreign government and arranges for the transfer of the fugitive to the agents appointed by the requesting country to receive him or her. Although the order following the extradition hearing is not appealable (by either the fugitive or the government), the fugitive may petition for a writ of habeas corpus as soon as the order is issued. The district court's decision on the writ is subject to appeal, and the extradition may be stayed if the court so orders.

==== Habeas corpus in international extradition ====
Habeas corpus is a legal procedure initiated by an individual to test the legality of his detention by the government. To benefit from habeas corpus, the affected person, or someone on his behalf, must file a petition for relief before a court with jurisdiction. The procedure is contained in 28 U.S.C. § 2241 et. seq. When the habeas petition contests the decision of an extradition magistrate, the individual must argue that his detention and surrender to a foreign country violates the United States Constitution, the applicable extradition treaty, or a federal statute.

Because orders of extradition cannot be appealed, the only means for an individual to have them reviewed is to file a request for a writ of habeas corpus. The government, on the other hand, may renew its request if the original one is denied. Habeas corpus review by a district court is generally available whenever an individual "is in custody in violation of the Constitution or laws or treaties of the United States", and is provided for several different types of detention in addition to extradition, such as detention after a criminal conviction, and for military purposes. As part of its habeas review, the court will normally accept the factual findings of the extradition magistrate, while legal issues are considered anew.

The scope of review of a writ of habeas corpus in extradition is meant to be limited. It is settled to cover at least inquiries on whether:

1. the extradition magistrate acquired jurisdiction over the individual and the matter;
2. the crime for which extradition is sought is included within the treaty as an extraditable offense, and
3. whether there is probable cause to commit the relator to trial.

Many courts, however, have adopted an "expanded" scope of habeas review that additionally considers issues about the violation of constitutional rights.

Petitioners in extradition cases may contest the legality of their detention though a habeas proceeding by arguing, for example, that the extradition treaty is not in force, that the alleged crime constitutes political behavior subject to exception, that the determination of extraditability by the magistrate has not been made according to the requirements of the applicable United States statutes and treaty, that the extradition procedure does not comply with the Constitution, and that the relator has not been formally charged.

Even though the decision of the extradition magistrate cannot be appealed, the habeas corpus determination by the district court is subject to appeal to the corresponding circuit court. Thereafter, review may be sought through certiorari to the Supreme Court.

=== Extradition to the United States ===
The federal structure of the United States can pose particular problems with respect to extraditions when the police power and the power of foreign relations are held at different levels of the federal hierarchy. For instance, in the United States, most criminal prosecutions occur at the state level, and most foreign relations occur at the federal level. In fact, under the United States Constitution, foreign countries may not have official treaty relations with sub-national units such as individual states; rather, they may have treaty relations only with the federal government. As a result, a state that wishes to prosecute an individual located in a foreign country must direct its extradition request through the federal government, which will negotiate the extradition with the foreign country. However, due to the constraints of federalism, any conditions on the extradition accepted by the federal government—such as not to impose the death penalty—are not binding on individual states.

In the case of Soering v. United Kingdom, the European Court of Human Rights ruled that the United Kingdom was not permitted under its treaty obligations to extradite an individual to the United States, because the United States' federal government was constitutionally unable to offer binding assurances that the death penalty would not be sought in Virginia courts. Ultimately, the Commonwealth of Virginia itself had to offer assurances to the federal government, which passed those assurances on to the United Kingdom, which extradited the individual to the United States.

Additional problems can arise due to differing criteria for crimes. For instance, in the United States, crossing state lines is a prerequisite for certain federal crimes (otherwise crimes such as murder are handled by state governments except in certain circumstances such as the killing of a federal official while performing official functions). This transportation clause is absent from the laws of many countries. Extradition treaties or subsequent diplomatic correspondence often include language providing that such criteria should not be taken into account when checking if the crime is one in the country from which extradition should apply.

To clarify the above point, if a person in the United States crosses the borders of the United States to go to another country, then that person has crossed a federal border, and federal law would apply in addition to state law. Crossing state lines (within the U.S.) in committing a crime could also create federal jurisdiction. In addition, travel by airplane in the United States subjects one to federal law, as all airports are subject to not only state jurisdiction but also federal jurisdiction under the Air Commerce Act and other acts.

It is unlawful for U.S. citizens to enter or exit the United States without a valid U.S. passport or Western Hemisphere Travel Initiative–compliant passport-replacement document, or without an exception or waiver. An application is required for the issuance of a passport. If a fugitive being extradited to the United States refuses to sign a passport application, the consular officer can sign it "without recourse."
