= Abdulrahman Alfozan =

Saudi Arabian computer engineer

Abdulrahman Alfozan is a Saudi Arabian computer engineer. He was formerly employed by OpenAI before being arrested in 2026 and charged with secretly planting a recording device in OpenAI offices.

Alfozan was born c.1991 and attended the Massachusetts Institute of Technology and the University of California, Berkeley, and had lived in the US for 15 years prior to working for OpenAI. From 2020 he had been a lawful permanent resident of the United States. He is a venture partner in Raed Ventures, a Saudi Arabian venture capital firm.

== Alleged concealed recording incident ==
Alfozan had worked for OpenAI since July 2025 before he allegedly attempted to conceal an audio recording device behind a television in a conference meeting room used by staff at the company's headquarters in San Francisco on or about 28 September 2026. OpenAI executives and American government officials had met in the room a few days previously. The device was plugged into a USB port in the television and covered with toilet paper. It was discovered by staff from OpenAI on 30 September. The contents of the device were encrypted. A camera was subsequently placed in the room on 5 October and Alfozan was filmed entering the room and he appeared to look behind the television. That same day a bag in a different room was found with Alfozan's ID and a similar recording device. Alfozan had no authority to participate in meetings in the room or access it.

The room was the site of discussions of "highly confidential" information on strategic, technical and commercial topics including plans for future products and proprietary research. The room was also the site of discussions of "Nonpublic information about Open AI's technical progress and strategic decisions, capabilities, priorities, government engagements, and commercial relationships" according to the United States Department of Justice.

=== Alleged preparation ===
Alfozan had allegedly used a productivity tool to enquire about the locations and addresses of meeting rooms and their associated calendars, meetings with external partners and "leadership and exec" locations at OpenAI. A chatbot account that was associated with Alfozan's wife had submitted prompts relating to the construction, testing, installation and concealing of a remote access device. The account also submitted prompts which included the "custom header and unique MAC address" of the recording device that was discovered.

== Arrest and aftermath ==
Alfozan was arrested by the Federal Bureau of Investigation (FBI) on 9 October. He was terminated from his contract with OpenAI. He had been due to fly from San Francisco to Riyadh in Saudi Arabia, with his wife and son on a one-way flight three days later. His wife had told FBI agents that she and her son were moving permanently to Saudi Arabia as their US visas were expiring and that Alfozan was later due to move with them. On 10 October his wife and son flew from San Francisco to Doha in Qatar on a one-way business class ticket that had been booked and paid for by a military official from Saudi Arabia.

Court filings in California following Alfozan's arrest accused him of having "considerable support" from the Saudi government. American prosecutors described him as having "frequent communication" with a member of the Saudi royal family, the unnamed person had tried to recruit Alfozan to a Saudi-based artificial intelligence venture. Alfozan had refused to leave OpenAI before he collected his OpenAI shares worth $2.2 million. In the Justice Department filing, it was alleged that the Saudi royal had told Alfozan that "Saudi needs you more" than the United States to which Alfozan replied, "100".

He was denied bail after having been deemed a flight risk. The US district judge Alex Tse said that there was "a risk of non-appearance that is significant". He was denied bail as Tse described the Saudi consulate offer to pay the bail as a "blank check...Even if I set it at $10 million, they are going to pay the entire bond". The United States does not have an extradition treaty with Saudi Arabia. Alfozan was indicted by a grand jury on 27 October on a single count of interception of oral communications. On 9 November Alfozan pleaded not guilty in federal court in San Francisco. Alfozan's next court hearing is scheduled for 17 November.

The director of National Intelligence, Jay Clayton, said that Alfozan's arrest "underscores why winning the global super intelligence race is a national security prerogative".
