= Article Four of the United States Constitution =

Portion of the US Constitution regarding states

Article Four of the United States Constitution outlines the relationship between the various states, as well as the relationship between each state and the United States federal government. It also empowers Congress to admit new states and administer the territories and other federal lands.

The Full Faith and Credit Clause requires states to extend "full faith and credit" to the public acts, records, and court proceedings of other states. The Supreme Court has held that this clause prevents states from reopening cases that have been conclusively decided by the courts of another state. The Privileges and Immunities Clause requires interstate protection of "privileges and immunities," preventing each state from treating citizens of other states in a discriminatory manner. The Extradition Clause requires that fugitives from justice be extradited on the demand of executive authority of the state from which they flee. Since the 1987 case of Puerto Rico v. Branstad, federal courts may also use the Extradition Clause to require the extradition of fugitives. The Fugitive Slave Clause requires the return of fugitive slaves; this clause was rendered moot by the Thirteenth Amendment, which abolished involuntary servitude, except in the prison system.

The Admissions Clause grants Congress the authority to admit new states but forbids the creation of new states from parts of existing states without the consent of the affected states. While the Admissions Clause does not expressly include the requirement that all states to be admitted on an equal footing, the Supreme Court has held that it is a constitutional requirement. The Property Clause grants Congress the power to make laws for the territories and other federal lands. The Guarantee Clause mandates that the United States guarantee that all states have a "republican form of government," though it does not define this term. Article Four also requires the United States to protect each state from invasion, and, at the request of a state, from "domestic violence."

== Section 1: Full faith and credit ==
Full Faith and Credit shall be given in each State to the public Acts, Records, and judicial Proceedings of every other State. And the Congress may by general Laws prescribe the Manner in which such Acts, Records and Proceedings shall be proved, and the Effect thereof.

The first section requires states to extend "full faith and credit" to the public acts, records, and court proceedings of other states. Congress may regulate the manner in which proof of such acts, records, or proceedings may be admitted.

In Mills v. Duryee, 1t1 U.S. (7 Cranch) 481 (1813), the United States Supreme Court ruled that the merits of a case, as settled by courts of one state, must be recognized by the courts of other states; state courts may not reopen cases which have been conclusively decided by the courts of another state. Later, Chief Justice John Marshall suggested that the judgment of one state court must be recognized by other states' courts as final. In McElmoyle v. Cohen, 38 U.S. (13 Pet.) 312 (1839), the court heard a case where one party obtained a judgment in South Carolina and sought to enforce it in Georgia, which had a statute of limitations that barred actions on judgments after a certain amount of time had passed since the judgment was entered. The court upheld Georgia's refusal to enforce the South Carolina judgment. The court found that out-of-state judgments are subject to the procedural law of the states where they are enforced, notwithstanding any priority accorded in the states in which they are issued.

== Section 2: Rights of state citizens; rights of extradition ==
=== Clause 1: Privileges and Immunities ===
The Citizens of each State shall be entitled to all Privileges and Immunities of Citizens in the several States.

Clause One of Section 2 requires interstate protection of "privileges and immunities". The seeming ambiguity of the clause has given rise to a number of different interpretations. Some contend that the clause requires Congress to treat all citizens equally. Others suggest that citizens of states carry the rights accorded by their home states while traveling in other states.

Neither of these theories has been endorsed by the Supreme Court, which has held that the clause means that a state may not discriminate against citizens of other states in favor of its own citizens. In Corfield v. Coryell, 6 F. Cas. 546 (C.C.E.D. Pa. 1823), the federal circuit court held that privileges and immunities in respect of which discrimination is barred include

protection by the Government; the enjoyment of life and liberty ... the right of a citizen of one State to pass through, or to reside in any other State, for purposes of trade, agriculture, professional pursuits, or otherwise; to claim the benefits of the writ of habeas corpus; to institute and maintain actions of any kind in the courts of the State; to take, hold and dispose of property, either real or personal; and an exemption from higher taxes or impositions than are paid by the other citizens of the State.

Most other benefits were held not to be protected privileges and immunities. In Corfield, the circuit court sustained a New Jersey law giving state residents the exclusive right to gather clams and oysters.

=== Clause 2: Extradition of fugitives ===
A Person charged in any State with Treason, Felony, or other Crime, who shall flee from Justice, and be found in another State, shall on demand of the executive Authority of the State from which he fled, be delivered up, to be removed to the State having Jurisdiction of the Crime.

Clause Two requires that fugitives from justice may be extradited on the demand of executive authority of the state from which they fled. The Supreme Court has held that it is not compulsory for the fugitive to have fled after an indictment was issued, but only that the fugitive fled after having committed the crime. The Constitution provides for the extradition of fugitives who have committed "treason, felony or other crime." That phrase incorporates all acts prohibited by the laws of a state, including misdemeanors and small, or petty, offenses.

In Kentucky v. Dennison (1860), the Supreme Court held that the federal courts may not compel state governors to surrender fugitives through the issue of writs of mandamus. The Dennison decision was overruled by Puerto Rico v. Branstad (1987); now, the federal courts may require the extradition of fugitives. Alleged fugitives generally may not challenge extradition proceedings.

The motives of the governor demanding the extradition may not be questioned. The accused cannot defend himself against the charges in the extraditing state; the fugitive must do so in the state receiving him. However, the accused may prevent extradition by offering clear evidence that he was not in the state he allegedly fled from at the time of the crime. There is no constitutional requirement that extradited fugitives be tried only for the crimes named in the extradition proceedings.

Fugitives brought to states by means other than extradition may be tried, even though the means of the conveyance was unlawful; the Supreme Court so ruled in Mahon v. Justice, 127 U.S. 700 (1888). In Mahon a body of armed men from Kentucky forcibly took, without a warrant, a man in West Virginia to bring him back to Kentucky for formal arrest and trial.

=== Clause 3: Fugitive Slave Clause ===
No Person held to Service or Labour in one State, under the Laws thereof, escaping into another, shall, in Consequence of any Law or Regulation therein, be discharged from such Service or Labour, but shall be delivered up on Claim of the Party to whom such Service or Labour may be due.

Pierce Butler and Charles Pinckney, both from South Carolina, submitted this clause to the Constitutional Convention. James Wilson of Pennsylvania objected, stating it would require that state governments enforce slavery at taxpayers' expense. Butler withdrew the clause. The next day the clause was reinstated and adopted by the Convention without objection. This clause was added to the clause that provided extradition for fugitives from justice.

When first adopted, this clause applied to fugitive slaves and required that they be extradited upon the claims of their masters, but it provided no means for doing so. The Fugitive Slave Act of 1793 created the mechanism for recovering a fugitive slave, overruled any state laws giving sanctuary, made it a federal crime to assist an escaped slave, and allowed slave-catchers into every U.S. state and territory. As free states sought to undermine the federal law, the even more severe Fugitive Slave Act of 1850 was enacted.

In 1864, during the Civil War, an effort to repeal this clause of the Constitution failed. The vote in the House was 69 for repeal and 38 against, which was short of the two-to-one vote required to amend the Constitution. This clause was rendered mostly moot when the Thirteenth Amendment abolished involuntary servitude.

== Section 3: New states and federal property ==
=== Clause 1: Admission of new states ===
New States may be admitted by the Congress into this Union; but no new States shall be formed or erected within the Jurisdiction of any other State; nor any State be formed by the Junction of two or more States, or parts of States, without the Consent of the Legislatures of the States concerned as well as of the Congress.

The First Clause of Section Three, also known as the Admissions Clause, grants to Congress the authority to admit new states into the Union. Since the establishment of the United States in 1776, the number of states has expanded from the original 13 to 50. It also forbids the creation of new states from parts of existing states without the consent of the affected states legislature and Congress. This latter provision was designed to give Eastern states that still had claims to Western lands (e.g., Virginia and North Carolina) to have a veto over whether their western counties (which eventually became Kentucky and Tennessee) could become states. It would later be applied with regard to the formation of Maine (from Massachusetts) and West Virginia (from Virginia).

At the 1787 Constitutional Convention, a proposal to include the phrase, "new States shall be admitted on the same terms with the original States", was defeated. It was feared that the political power of future new western states would eventually overwhelm that of the established eastern states. Once the new Constitution went into effect, however, Congress admitted Vermont and Kentucky on equal terms and thereafter formalized the condition in its acts of admission for subsequent states, declaring that the new state enters "on an equal footing with the original States in all respects whatever." Thus the Congress, utilizing the discretion allowed by the framers, adopted a policy of equal status for all newly admitted states. With the growth of states' rights advocacy during the antebellum period, the Supreme Court ruled, in Lessee of Pollard v. Hagan (1845), that the Constitution mandated admission of new states on the basis of equality.

Congressional restrictions on the equality of states, even when those limitations have been found in the acts of admission, have been held void by the Supreme Court. For instance the Supreme Court struck down a provision which limited the jurisdiction of the state of Alabama over navigable waters within the state. The Court held,

Alabama is, therefore, entitled to the sovereignty and jurisdiction over all the territory within her limits ... to maintain any other doctrine, is to deny that Alabama has been admitted into the union on an equal footing with the original states ... to Alabama belong the navigable waters and soils under them.

The doctrine can also be applied to the detriment of states, as occurred with Texas. Before admission to the Union, Texas, as an independent nation, controlled water within three miles of the coast, the normal limit for nations. Under the equal footing doctrine, Texas was found not to have control over the three-mile belt after admission into the Union, because the original states did not at the time of joining the union control such waters. Instead, by entering the Union, Texas was found to have surrendered control over the water and the soil under it to Congress. Under the Submerged Lands Act of 1953, Congress returned maritime territory to some states, but not to others; the Act was sustained by the Supreme Court.

The constitution does not state whether a state may unilaterally leave, or secede from, the Union. However, the Supreme Court, in Texas v. White (1869), held that a state cannot unilaterally do so.

When, therefore, Texas became one of the United States, she entered into an indissoluble relation. All the obligations of perpetual union, and all the guaranties of republican government in the Union, attached at once to the State. The act which consummated her admission into the Union was something more than a compact; it was the incorporation of a new member into the political body. And it was final. The union between Texas and the other States was as complete, as perpetual, and as indissoluble as the union between the original States. There was no place for reconsideration, or revocation, except through revolution, or through consent of the States.

=== Clause 2: Property Clause ===
The Congress shall have Power to dispose of and make all needful Rules and Regulations respecting the Territory or other Property belonging to the United States; and nothing in this Constitution shall be so construed as to Prejudice any Claims of the United States, or of any particular State.

This clause, commonly known as the "Property Clause" or "Territorial Clause", grants Congress the constitutional authority for the management and control of all territories or other property owned by the United States. The clause also proclaims that nothing contained within the Constitution may be interpreted to harm (prejudice) any claim of the United States, or of any particular State. The exact scope of this clause has long been a matter of debate.

The federal government owns about twenty-eight percent of the land in the United States. These holdings include national parks, national forests, recreation areas, wildlife refuges, vast tracts of range and public lands managed by the Bureau of Land Management, reservations held in trust for Native American tribes, military bases, and ordinary federal buildings and installations. Federal property can be found in every state, and the largest concentrations are in the Western United States, where, for example, the federal government owns over eighty percent of the land within Nevada.

Pursuant to a parallel clause in Article One, Section Eight, the Supreme Court has held that states may not tax such federal property. In another case, Kleppe v. New Mexico, the Court ruled that the federal Wild Horse and Burro Act was a constitutional exercise of congressional power under the Property Clause – at least insofar as it was applied to a finding of trespass. The case prohibited the entering upon the public lands of the United States and removing wild burros under the New Mexico Estray Law.

A major issue early in the 20th century was whether the whole Constitution applied to the territories called insular areas by Congress. In a series of opinions by the Supreme Court of the United States, referred to as the Insular Cases, the Court ruled that the territories belonged to, but were not part of the United States. Therefore, under the Territorial clause, Congress had the power to determine which parts of the Constitution applied to the territories. These rulings have helped shape public opinion among Puerto Ricans during the ongoing debate over the commonwealth's political status.

== Section 4: Obligations of the United States ==
=== Clause 1: Republican government ===
The United States shall guarantee to every State in this Union a Republican Form of Government, [...]

This clause, sometimes referred to as the Guarantee Clause, has long been at the forefront of the debate about the rights of citizens vis-à-vis the government. The Guarantee Clause mandates that all U.S. states must be grounded in republican principles such as the consent of the governed. By ensuring that all states must have the same basic republican philosophy, the Guarantee Clause is one of several portions of the Constitution which mandates symmetric federalism between the states.

The Constitution does not explain what exactly constitutes a republican form of government. There are, however, several places within it where the principles behind the concept are articulated. Article Seven, the last and shortest of the Constitution's original articles, stipulated that the Constitution, before it could become established as the "Law of the Land", must obtain the consent of the people by being ratified by popular conventions within the several states. Additionally, as it required the ratification of nine states in order to become established, rather than the unanimous consent required by the Articles of Confederation, the Constitution was more republican, as it protected the majority from effectively being ruled or held captive by the minority.

The Federalist Papers also gives some insight as to the intent of the Founders. A republican form of government is distinguished from a direct democracy, which the Founding Fathers had no intentions of entering. As James Madison wrote in Federalist No. 10, "Hence it is that such democracies have ever been spectacles of turbulence and contention; have ever been found incompatible with personal security or the rights of property; and have in general been as short in their lives as they have been violent in their deaths."

A political crisis in 1840s Rhode Island, the Dorr Rebellion, forced the Supreme Court to rule on the meaning of this clause. At the time, the Rhode Island constitution was the old royal charter established in the 17th century. By the 1840s, 40% of the state's free white males were enfranchised. An attempt to hold a popular convention to write a new constitution was declared insurrection by the charter government, and the convention leaders were arrested. One of them brought suit in federal court, arguing that Rhode Island's government was not "republican" in character, and that his arrest (along with all of the government's other acts) was invalid. In Luther v. Borden, the Court held that the determination of whether a state government is a legitimate republican form as guaranteed by the Constitution is a political question to be resolved by the Congress. In effect, the court held the clause to be nonjusticiable.

The Luther v. Borden ruling left the responsibility to establish guidelines for the republican nature of state governments in the hands of the Congress. This power became an important part of Reconstruction after the American Civil War. The Radical Republican majority used this clause as the basis for taking control of the ex-Confederate states and for promoting civil rights for freedmen, plus the limiting of political and voting rights for ex-Confederates, abolishing the ex-Confederate state governments, setting guidelines for the readmission of the rebellious states into the Union.

In 1912, Luther was reaffirmed in Pacific States Telephone and Telegraph Co. v. Oregon. In Pacific States, a utility company challenged an Oregon tax law passed by a referendum, as opposed to the ordinary legislative process. The utility company claimed that the use of referendums, as a form of direct democracy, violated the republican form of government clause, which permits only a representative democracy. The court rejected the challenge, finding the challenge to have presented a nonjusticiable political question that only Congress can resolve.

The doctrine was later limited in Baker v. Carr (1962), which held that the lack of state legislative redistricting to be justiciable.

The Supreme Court's holding in Luther v. Borden still holds today. The Court, by looking to the Equal Protection Clause of the Fourteenth Amendment (adopted 19 years after Luther v. Borden was decided), has developed new criteria for determining which questions are political in nature and which are justiciable.

=== Clause 2: Protection from invasion and domestic violence ===
[...] and [the United States] shall protect each of them [the States] against Invasion; and on Application of the Legislature, or of the Executive (when the Legislature cannot be convened) against domestic Violence.

Section Four requires the United States to protect each state from invasion, and, upon the application of the state legislature (or executive, if the legislature cannot be convened), from domestic violence. This provision was invoked by Colorado governor Elias M. Ammons in 1914 during the Colorado Coalfield War, as a result of which President Woodrow Wilson sent federal troops to the state.

== See also ==
- Devolution
- List of states and territories of the United States
