= U.S. state =

Constituent polity of the United States

State
- Also known as: Commonwealth (the self-designation of four states)
- Category: Federated state
- Location: United States
- Number: 50
- Populations: Smallest: Wyoming, 576,851; Largest: California, 39,538,223
- Areas: Smallest: Rhode Island, 1,545 square miles (4,000 km^{2}); Largest: Alaska, 665,384 square miles (1,723,340 km^{2})
- Government: State government
- Subdivisions: County (or equivalent)

In the United States, a state is a constituent political entity, of which there are 50. Bound together in a political union, each state holds governmental jurisdiction over a separate and defined geographic territory where it shares its sovereignty with the federal government. Due to this shared sovereignty, Americans are citizens both of the federal republic and of the state in which they reside. State citizenship and residency are flexible, and no government approval is required to move between states, except for persons restricted by certain types of court orders, such as paroled convicts and children of divorced spouses who share child custody.

State governments in the U.S. are allocated power by the people of each respective state through their individual state constitutions. All are grounded in republican principles (this being required by the federal constitution), and each provides for a government, consisting of three branches, each with separate and independent powers: executive, legislative, and judicial. States are divided into counties or county-equivalents, which may be assigned some local governmental authority but are not sovereign. County or county-equivalent structure varies widely by state, and states also create other local governments.

States, unlike U.S. territories, possess many powers and rights under the United States Constitution. States and their citizens are represented in the United States Congress, a bicameral legislature consisting of the Senate and the House of Representatives. Each state is also entitled to select a number of electors, equal to the total number of representatives and senators from that state, to vote in the Electoral College, the body that directly elects the president of the United States. Each state has the opportunity to ratify constitutional amendments. With the consent of Congress, two or more states may enter into interstate compacts with one another. The police power of each state is also recognized.

Historically, the tasks of local law enforcement, public education, public health, intrastate commerce regulation, and local transportation and infrastructure, in addition to local, state, and federal elections, have generally been considered primarily state responsibilities, although all of these now have significant federal funding and regulation as well. Over time, the Constitution has been amended, and the interpretation and application of its provisions have changed. The general tendency has been toward centralization and incorporation, with the federal government playing a much larger role than it once did. There is a continuing debate over states' rights, which concerns the extent and nature of the states' powers and sovereignty in relation to the federal government and the rights of individuals.

The Constitution grants to Congress the authority to admit new states into the Union. Since the establishment of the United States in 1776 by the Thirteen Colonies, the number of states has expanded from the original 13 to 50. Each new state has been admitted on an equal footing with the existing states. While the Constitution does not explicitly discuss secession from the Union, the United States Supreme Court held in Texas v. White (1869) that the Constitution does not permit states to unilaterally do so.

== List ==
The 50 states, in alphabetical order, along with each state's flag:

- Alabama
- Alaska
- Arizona
- Arkansas
- California
- Colorado
- Connecticut
- Delaware
- Florida
- Georgia
- Hawaii
- Idaho
- Illinois
- Indiana
- Iowa
- Kansas
- Kentucky
- Louisiana
- Maine
- Maryland
- Massachusetts
- Michigan
- Minnesota
- Mississippi
- Missouri
- Montana
- Nebraska
- Nevada
- New Hampshire
- New Jersey
- New Mexico
- New York
- North Carolina
- North Dakota
- Ohio
- Oklahoma
- Oregon
- Pennsylvania
- Rhode Island
- South Carolina
- South Dakota
- Tennessee
- Texas
- Utah
- Vermont
- Virginia
- Washington
- West Virginia
- Wisconsin
- Wyoming

== Background ==
The 13 original states came into existence in July 1776 during the American Revolutionary War (1775–1783), as the successors of the Thirteen Colonies, upon agreeing to the Lee Resolution and signing the United States Declaration of Independence. Prior to these events each state had been a British colony; each then joined the first Union of states between 1777 and 1781, upon ratifying the Articles of Confederation, the first U.S. constitution. During this period, the newly independent states developed their own individual state constitutions, among the earliest written constitutions in the world.

Although different in detail, these state constitutions shared features that would be important in the American constitutional order: they were republican in form, and separated power among three branches, most had bicameral legislatures, and contained statements, or a bill, of rights. From 1787 to 1790, each of the states ratified a new federal frame of government in the Constitution of the United States. In relation to the states, the U.S. Constitution elaborated concepts of federalism.

== Governments ==
Under U.S. constitutional law, the 50 individual states and the United States as a whole are each sovereign jurisdictions. The states are not administrative divisions of the country; the Tenth Amendment to the United States Constitution reserves to the states or to the people all powers of government not delegated to the federal government.

Consequently, each of the 50 states reserves the right to organize its individual government in any way (within the broad parameters set by the U.S. Constitution and the Republican Guarantee enforced by Congress) deemed appropriate by its people, and to exercise all powers of government not delegated to the federal government by the Constitution. A state, unlike the federal government, has un-enumerated police power, that is, the right to generally make all necessary laws for the welfare of its people. As a result, while the governments of the various states share many similar features, they often vary greatly with regard to form and substance. No two state governments are identical.

=== Constitutions ===
The government of each state is structured in accordance with its individual constitution, all of which are written constitutions. Many of these documents are more detailed and more elaborated than their federal counterpart. For example, before its revision in 2022, the Constitution of Alabama, contained 310,296 words, which is more than 40 times as many as the U.S. Constitution. In practice, each state has adopted a three-branch frame of government: executive, legislative, and judicial, even though doing so has never been required.

Early in American history, four state governments differentiated themselves from the others in their first constitutions by choosing to self-identify as Commonwealths rather than as states: Virginia, in 1776; Pennsylvania, in 1777; Massachusetts, in 1780; and Kentucky, in 1792. Consequently, while these four are states like the other states, each is formally a commonwealth because the term is contained in its constitution.

The term, commonwealth, which refers to a state in which the supreme power is vested in the people, was first used in Virginia during the Interregnum, the 1649–60 period between the reigns of Charles I and Charles II, during which parliament's Oliver Cromwell as Lord Protector established a republican government known as the Commonwealth of England. Virginia became a royal colony again in 1660, and the word was dropped from the full title. It went unused until reintroduced in 1776.

==== Executive ====
In each state, the chief executive is called the governor, who serves as both head of state and head of government. All governors are chosen by statewide direct election. The governor may approve or veto bills passed by the state legislature, as well as recommend and work for the passage of bills, usually supported by their political party. In 44 states, governors have line item veto power.

Elections of officials in the United States are generally for a fixed term of office. The constitutions of 19 states allow for citizens to remove and replace an elected public official before the end of their term of office through a recall election. Each state follows its own procedures for recall elections, and sets its own restrictions on how often, and how soon after a general election, they may be held. In all states, the legislatures can remove state executive branch officials, including governors, who have committed serious abuses of their power from office. The process of doing so includes impeachment (the bringing of specific charges), and a trial, wherein legislators act as a jury.

==== Legislative ====
The primary responsibilities of state legislatures are to enact state laws and appropriate money for the administration of public policy. In all states, if the governor vetoes a bill, or a portion of one, it can still become law if the legislature overrides the veto (repasses the bill), which in most states requires a two-thirds vote in each chamber.

In 49 of the 50 states the legislature consists of two chambers: a lower house (variously called the House of Representatives, State Assembly, General Assembly or House of Delegates) and a smaller upper house, in all states called the Senate. The exception is the unicameral Nebraska Legislature, meaning it has only a single chamber. Most states have a part-time legislature, traditionally called a citizen legislature. Ten state legislatures are considered full-time. These bodies are more similar to the U.S. Congress than are the others.

Members of each state's legislature are chosen by direct election. In Baker v. Carr (1962) and Reynolds v. Sims (1964), the U.S. Supreme Court held that all states are required to elect their legislatures in such a way as to afford each citizen the same degree of representation (the one person, one vote standard). In practice, most states elect legislators from single-member districts, each of which has approximately the same population. Some states, such as Maryland and Vermont, divide the state into single- and multi-member districts. In this case, multi-member districts must have proportionately larger populations, e.g., a district electing two representatives must have approximately twice the population of a district electing just one. The voting systems used across the nation are: first-past-the-post in single-member districts, and multiple non-transferable vote in multi-member districts.

In 2013, there were 7,383 legislators in the 50 state legislative bodies. They earned from $0 annually (New Mexico) to $90,526 (California). There were various per diem and mileage compensation.

==== Judicial ====
States can also organize their judicial systems differently from the federal judiciary, as long as they protect the federal constitutional right of their citizens to procedural due process. Most have a trial-level court, generally called a district court, superior court or circuit court, a first-level appellate court, generally called a court of appeal (or appeals), and a supreme court. Oklahoma and Texas have separate highest courts for criminal appeals. Uniquely, in New York State, the trial court is called the Supreme Court; appeals go up first to the Supreme Court's Appellate Division, and from there to its highest court, the New York Court of Appeals.

State court systems exercise broad, plenary, and general jurisdiction, in contrast to the federal courts, which are courts of limited jurisdiction. The overwhelming majority of criminal and civil cases in the United States are heard in state courts. Each year, roughly 30 million new cases are filed in state courts and the total number of judges across all state courts is about 30,000—for comparison, 1 million new cases are filed each year in federal courts, which have about 1,700 judges.

Most states base their legal system on English common law (with substantial statutory changes and incorporation of certain civil law innovations), with the notable exception of Louisiana, a former French colony, which draws large parts of its legal system from French civil law.

Only a few states choose to have the judges on the state's courts serve for life terms. In most states, the judges, including the justices of the highest court in the state, are either elected or appointed for terms of a limited number of years and are usually eligible for re-election or reappointment.

=== Unitarism ===
All states are unitary states, not federations or aggregates of local governments. Local governments within them are created by and exist by virtue of state law, and local governments within each state are subject to the central authority of that particular state. State governments commonly delegate some authority to local units and channel policy decisions down to them for implementation. In a few states, local units of government are permitted a degree of home rule over various matters. The prevailing legal theory of state preeminence over local governments, referred to as Dillon's Rule, holds that,

A municipal corporation possesses and can exercise the following powers and no others: First, those granted in express words; second, those necessarily implied or necessarily incident to the powers expressly granted; third, those absolutely essential to the declared objects and purposes of the corporation—not simply convenient but indispensable; fourth, any fair doubt as to the existence of power is resolved by the courts against the corporation—against the existence of the powers.

Each state defines for itself what powers it will allow local governments. Generally, four categories of power may be given to local jurisdictions:

- Structural – power to choose the form of government, charter and enact charter revisions,
- Functional – power to exercise local self-government in a broad or limited manner,
- Fiscal – authority to determine revenue sources, set tax rates, borrow funds and other related financial activities,
- Personnel – authority to set employment rules, remuneration rates, employment conditions and collective bargaining.

== Relationships ==
=== Interstate ===
Each state admitted to the Union by Congress since 1789 has entered it on an equal footing with the original states in all respects. With the growth of states' rights advocacy during the antebellum period, the Supreme Court asserted, in Lessee of Pollard v. Hagan (1845), that the Constitution mandated admission of new states on the basis of equality. With the consent of Congress, states may enter into interstate compacts, agreements between two or more states. Compacts are frequently used to manage a shared resource, such as transportation infrastructure or water rights.

Under Article IV of the Constitution, which outlines the relationship between the states, each state is required to give full faith and credit to the acts of each other's legislatures and courts, which is generally held to include the recognition of most contracts and criminal judgments, and before 1865, slavery status. Pursuant to the Extradition Clause, a state must extradite people located there who have fled charges of "treason, felony, or other crimes" in another state if the other state so demands.

The full faith and credit expectation does have exceptions, some legal arrangements, such as professional licensure and marriages, may be state-specific, and until recently states have not been found by the courts to be required to honor such arrangements from other states. Such legal acts are nevertheless often recognized state-to-state according to the common practice of comity. States are prohibited from discriminating against citizens of other states with respect to their basic rights, under the Privileges and Immunities Clause.

=== With the federal government ===
Under Article IV, each state is guaranteed a form of government that is grounded in republican principles, such as the consent of the governed. This guarantee has long been at the forefront of the debate about the rights of citizens vis-à-vis the government. States are also guaranteed protection from invasion, and, upon the application of the state legislature (or executive, if the legislature cannot be convened), from domestic violence. This provision was discussed during the 1967 Detroit riot but was not invoked.

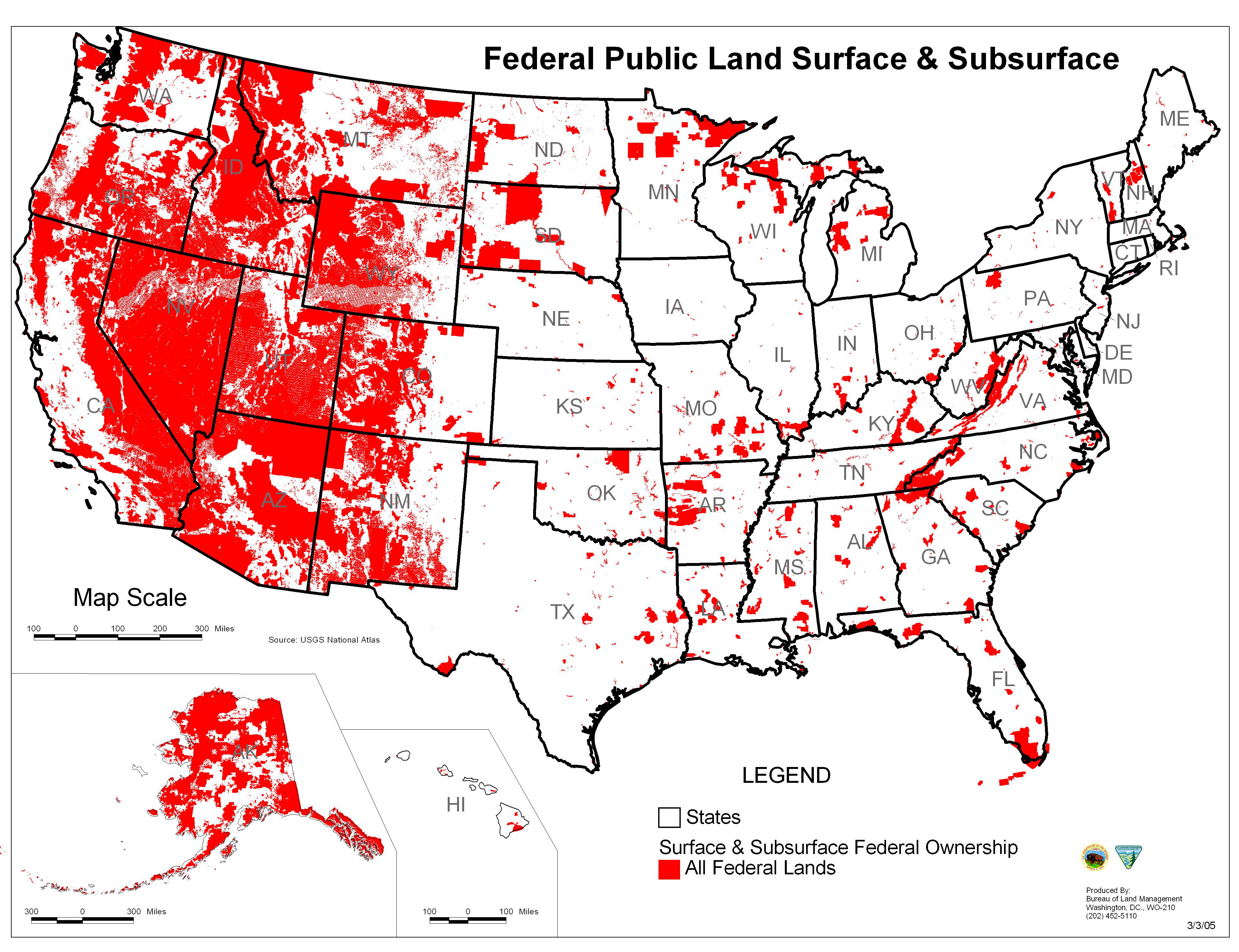
Ownership of federal lands in the 50 states, 2005

The Supremacy Clause (Article VI, Clause 2) establishes that the Constitution, federal laws made pursuant to it, and treaties made under its authority, constitute the supreme law of the land. It provides that state courts are bound by the supreme law; in case of conflict between federal and state law, the federal law must be applied. Even state constitutions are subordinate to federal law.

States' rights are understood mainly with reference to the Tenth Amendment. The Constitution delegates some powers to the national government, and it forbids some powers to the states. The Tenth Amendment reserves all other powers to the states, or to the people. Powers of the U.S. Congress are enumerated in Article I, Section 8, for example, the power to declare war. Making treaties is one power forbidden to the states, being listed among other such powers in Article I, Section 10.

Among the Article I enumerated powers of Congress is the power to regulate commerce. Since the early 20th century, the Supreme Court's interpretation of this "Commerce Clause" has, over time, greatly expanded the scope of federal power, at the expense of powers formerly considered purely states' matters. The Cambridge Economic History of the United States says, "On the whole, especially after the mid-1880s, the Court construed the Commerce Clause in favor of increased federal power."

In 1941, the Supreme Court in U.S. v. Darby upheld the Fair Labor Standards Act of 1938, holding that Congress had the power under the Commerce Clause to regulate employment conditions. In 1942, in Wickard v. Filburn, the Court expanded federal power to regulate the economy by holding that federal authority under the commerce clause extends to activities which may appear to be local in nature but in reality effect the entire national economy and are therefore of national concern.

For example, Congress can regulate railway traffic across state lines, but it may also regulate rail traffic solely within a state, based on the reality that intrastate traffic still affects interstate commerce. Through such decisions, argues law professor David F. Forte, "the Court turned the commerce power into the equivalent of a general regulatory power and undid the Framers' original structure of limited and delegated powers." Subsequently, Congress invoked the Commerce Clause to expand federal criminal legislation, as well as for social reforms such as the Civil Rights Act of 1964. Only within the past couple of decades, through decisions in cases such as those in U.S. v. Lopez (1995) and U.S. v. Morrison (2000), has the Court tried to limit the Commerce Clause power of Congress.

Another enumerated congressional power is its taxing and spending power. An example of this is the system of federal aid for highways, which include the Interstate Highway System. The system is mandated and largely funded by the federal government and serves the interests of the states. By threatening to withhold federal highway funds, Congress has been able to pressure state legislatures to pass various laws. An example is the nationwide legal drinking age of 21, enacted by each state, brought about by the National Minimum Drinking Age Act. Although some objected that this infringes on states' rights, the Supreme Court upheld the practice as a permissible use of the Constitution's Spending Clause in South Dakota v. Dole 483 U.S. 203 (1987).

As prescribed by Article I of the Constitution, which establishes the U.S. Congress, each state is represented in the Senate (irrespective of population size) by two senators, and each is guaranteed at least one representative in the House. Both senators and representatives are chosen in direct popular elections in the various states. Prior to 1913, senators were elected by state legislatures. There are presently 100 senators, who are elected at-large to staggered terms of six years, with one-third of them being chosen every two years. Representatives are elected at large or from single-member districts to terms of two years, not staggered. The size of the House—presently 435 voting members—is set by federal statute. Seats in the House are distributed among the states in proportion to the most recent constitutionally mandated decennial census. The borders of these districts are established by the states individually through a process called redistricting, and within each state all districts are required to have approximately equal populations.

Citizens in each state plus those in the District of Columbia indirectly elect the president and vice president. When casting ballots in presidential elections they are voting for presidential electors, who then, using procedures provided in the 12th amendment, elect the president and vice president. There were 538 electors for the most recent presidential election in 2024; the allocation of electoral votes was based on the 2010 census. Each state is entitled to a number of electors equal to the total number of representatives and senators from that state; the District of Columbia is entitled to three electors.

While the Constitution does set parameters for the election of federal officials, state law, not federal, regulates most aspects of elections in the U.S., including primaries, the eligibility of voters (beyond the basic constitutional definition), the running of each state's electoral college, as well as the running of state and local elections. All elections—federal, state, and local—are administered by the individual states, and some voting rules and procedures may differ among them.

Article V of the Constitution accords states a key role in the process of amending the U.S. Constitution. Amendments may be proposed either by Congress with a two-thirds vote in both the House and the Senate, or by a constitutional convention called for by two-thirds of the state legislatures. To become part of the Constitution, an amendment must be ratified by either—as determined by Congress—the legislatures of three-quarters of the states or state ratifying conventions in three-quarters of the states. The vote in each state (to either ratify or reject a proposed amendment) carries equal weight, regardless of a state's population or length of time in the Union.

=== With other countries ===
U.S. states are not sovereign in the Westphalian sense in international law which says that each State has sovereignty over its territory and domestic affairs, to the exclusion of all external powers, on the principle of non-interference in another State's domestic affairs, and that each State, no matter how large or small, is equal in international law. The 50 U.S. states do not possess international legal sovereignty, meaning that they are not recognized by other sovereign States such as, for example, France, Germany or the United Kingdom. The federal government is responsible for international relations, but state and local government leaders occasionally travel to other countries and form economic and cultural relationships.

== Admission into the Union ==
U.S. states by date of statehood: 1776–1790 1791–1796 1803–1819 1820–1837 1845–1859 1861–1876 1889–1896 1907–1912 1959

The order in which the original 13 states ratified the Constitution, then the order in which the others were admitted to the Union

Article IV also grants to Congress the authority to admit new states into the Union. Since the establishment of the United States in 1776, the number of states has expanded from the original 13 to 50. Each new state has been admitted on an equal footing with the existing states. Article IV also forbids the creation of new states from parts of existing states without the consent of both the affected states and Congress. This caveat was designed to give Eastern states that still had Western land claims (including Georgia, North Carolina, and Virginia) to have a veto over whether their western counties could become states, and has served this same function since, whenever a proposal to partition an existing state or states in order that a region within might either join another state or to create a new state has come before Congress.

Most of the states admitted to the Union after the original 13 were formed from an organized territory established and governed by Congress in accord with its plenary power under Article IV, Section 3, Clause 2. The outline for this process was established by the Northwest Ordinance (1787), which predates the ratification of the Constitution. In some cases, an entire territory has become a state; in others some part of a territory has.

When the people of a territory make their desire for statehood known to the federal government, Congress may pass an enabling act authorizing the people of that territory to organize a constitutional convention to write a state constitution as a step toward admission to the Union. Each act details the mechanism by which the territory will be admitted as a state following ratification of their constitution and election of state officers. Although the use of an enabling act is a traditional historic practice, a number of territories have drafted constitutions for submission to Congress absent an enabling act and were subsequently admitted. Upon acceptance of that constitution and meeting any additional congressional stipulations, Congress has always admitted that territory as a state.

In addition to the original 13, six subsequent states were never an organized territory of the federal government, or part of one, before being admitted to the Union. Three were set off from an already existing state, two entered the Union after having been sovereign states, and one was established from unorganized territory:

- California, 1850, from land ceded to the United States by Mexico in 1848 under the terms of the Treaty of Guadalupe Hidalgo.
- Kentucky, 1792, from Virginia (District of Kentucky: Fayette, Jefferson, and Lincoln counties)
- Maine, 1820, from Massachusetts (District of Maine)
- Texas, 1845, previously the Republic of Texas
- Vermont, 1791, previously the Vermont Republic (also known as the New Hampshire Grants and claimed by New York)
- West Virginia, 1863, from Virginia (Trans-Allegheny region counties) during the Civil War

Congress is under no obligation to admit states, even in those areas whose population expresses a desire for statehood. Such has been the case numerous times during the nation's history. The first instance occurred while the nation still operated under the Articles of Confederation. The State of Franklin existed for several years, not long after the end of the American Revolution, but was never recognized by the Confederation Congress, which ultimately recognized North Carolina's claim of sovereignty over the area. The territory comprising Franklin later became part of the Southwest Territory, and ultimately of the state of Tennessee. In another instance, Mormon pioneers in Salt Lake City sought to establish the state of Deseret in 1849. It existed for slightly over two years and was never approved by the United States Congress. In another, leaders of the Five Civilized Tribes (Cherokee, Chickasaw, Choctaw, Creek, and Seminole) in Indian Territory proposed to establish the state of Sequoyah in 1905, as a means to retain control of their lands. The proposed constitution ultimately failed in the U.S. Congress. Instead, the Indian Territory and Oklahoma Territory were both incorporated into the new state of Oklahoma in 1907.

The entry of several states into the Union was delayed due to distinctive complicating factors. Among them, Michigan Territory, which petitioned Congress for statehood in 1835, was not admitted to the Union until 1837, due to a boundary dispute with the adjoining state of Ohio. The Republic of Texas requested annexation to the United States in 1837, but fears about potential conflict with Mexico delayed the admission of Texas for nine years. Statehood for Kansas Territory was held up for several years (1854–61) due to a series of internal violent conflicts involving anti-slavery and pro-slavery factions. West Virginia's bid for statehood was also delayed over slavery and was settled when it agreed to adopt a gradual abolition plan.

== Proposed additions ==
=== Guam ===
Guam is an organized, unincorporated territory of the United States in the western Pacific Ocean. The future political status of Guam has been a matter of significant discussion, with public opinion polls indicating a strong preference of becoming a U.S. state.

=== Puerto Rico ===
Puerto Rico, an unincorporated U.S. territory, refers to itself as the "Commonwealth of Puerto Rico" in the English version of its constitution, and as "Estado Libre Asociado" (literally, Associated Free State) in the Spanish version. As with all U.S. territories, its residents do not have full representation in the United States Congress. Puerto Rico has limited representation in the U.S. House of Representatives in the form of a Resident Commissioner, a delegate with limited voting rights in the Committee of the Whole House on the State of the Union, but no voting rights otherwise.

A non-binding referendum on statehood, independence, or a new option for an associated territory (different from the current status) was held on November 6, 2012. Sixty one percent (61%) of voters chose the statehood option, while one third of the ballots were submitted blank.

On December 11, 2012, the Legislative Assembly of Puerto Rico enacted a concurrent resolution requesting the President and the Congress of the United States to respond to the referendum of the people of Puerto Rico, held on November 6, 2012, to end its current form of territorial status and to begin the process to admit Puerto Rico as a state.

Another status referendum was held on June 11, 2017, wherein 97% percent of voters chose statehood. Turnout was low, as only 23% of voters went to the polls, with advocates of both continued territorial status and independence urging voters to boycott it.

On June 27, 2018, the H.R. 6246 Act was introduced on the U.S. House with the purpose of responding to, and comply with, the democratic will of the United States citizens residing in Puerto Rico as expressed in the plebiscites held on November 6, 2012, and June 11, 2017, by setting forth the terms for the admission of the territory of Puerto Rico as a state of the Union. The act has 37 original cosponsors between Republicans and Democrats in the U.S. House of Representatives.

On November 3, 2020, Puerto Rico held another referendum. In the non-binding referendum, Puerto Ricans voted in favor of becoming a state. They also voted for a pro-statehood governor, Pedro Pierluisi.

=== Washington, D.C. ===
The intention of the Founding Fathers was that the United States capital should be at a neutral site, not giving favor to any existing state; as a result, the District of Columbia was created in 1800 to serve as the seat of government. As it is not a state, the district does not have representation in the Senate and has a non-voting delegate in the House; neither does it have a sovereign elected government. Additionally, before ratification of the 23rd Amendment in 1961, district citizens did not get the right to vote in presidential elections.

The strong majority of residents of the District support statehood of some form for that jurisdiction – either statehood for the whole district or for the inhabited part, with the remainder remaining under federal jurisdiction. In November 2016, Washington, D.C. residents voted in a statehood referendum in which 86% of voters supported statehood for Washington, D.C. For statehood to be achieved, it must be approved by Congress.

== Secession from the Union ==
The Constitution speaks of "union" several times, but does not explicitly discuss the issue of whether a state can secede from the Union. Its predecessor, the Articles of Confederation, stated that the union of the United States "shall be perpetual." The question of whether or not individual states held the unilateral right to secession was a passionately debated feature of the nations' political discourse from early in its history and remained a difficult and divisive topic until the American Civil War. In 1860 and 1861, 11 southern states each declared secession from the United States and joined to form the Confederate States of America (CSA). Following the defeat of Confederate forces by Union armies in 1865, those states were brought back into the Union during the ensuing Reconstruction era. The federal government never recognized the sovereignty of the CSA, nor the validity of the ordinances of secession adopted by the seceding states.

Following the war, the United States Supreme Court, in Texas v. White (1869), held that states did not have the right to secede and that any act of secession was legally void. Drawing on the "perpetual" union language of the Articles of Confederation, and its succeeding Preamble to the Constitution, which states that the Constitution intends to "form a more perfect union", and speaks of the people of the United States a single body politic who are the authors of the more perfect union ("We the people"), the Supreme Court found that states did not have a right to secede. The court's reference in the same decision to the possibility of such changes occurring "through revolution, or through consent of the States", essentially means that this decision holds that no state has a right to unilaterally decide to leave the Union.

== Name origins ==
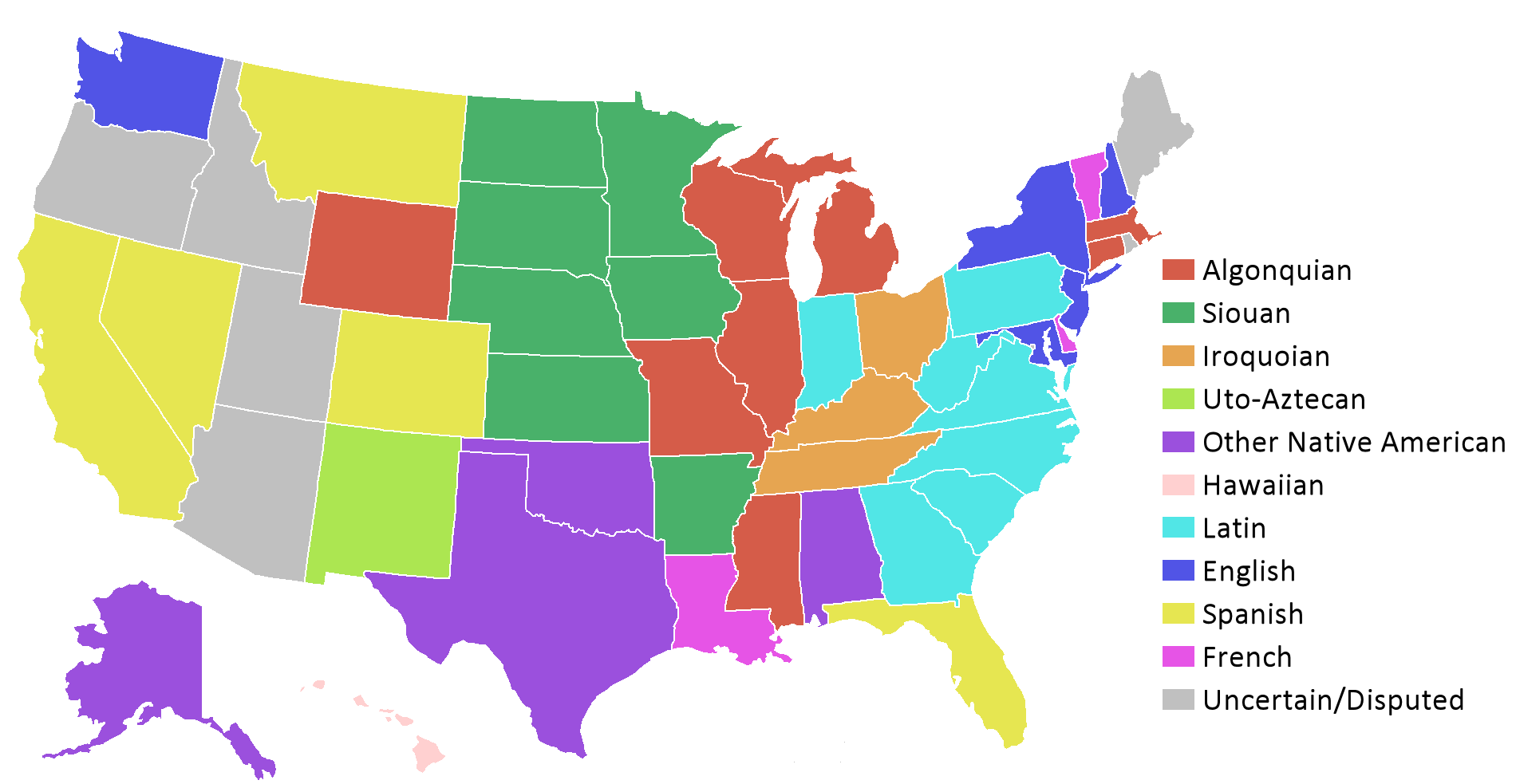
A map showing the source languages of state names

The 50 states have taken their names from a wide variety of languages. Twenty-four state names originate from Native American languages. Of these, eight are from Algonquian languages, seven are from Siouan languages, three are from Iroquoian languages, one is from Uto-Aztecan languages and five others are from other indigenous languages. Hawaii's name is derived from the Polynesian Hawaiian language.

Of the remaining names, 22 are from European languages. Seven are from Latin (mainly Latinized forms of English names) and the rest are from English, Spanish and French. Eleven states are named after individual people, including seven named for royalty and one named after a President of the United States. The origins of six state names are unknown or disputed. Several of the states that derive their names from names used for Native peoples retain the final letter "s" in the indigenous name.

== Geography ==
=== Borders ===
The borders of the 13 original states were largely determined by colonial charters. Their western boundaries were subsequently modified as the states ceded their western land claims to the Federal government during the 1780s and 1790s. Many state borders beyond those of the original 13 were set by Congress as it created territories, divided them, and over time, created states within them. Territorial and new state lines often followed various geographic features (such as rivers or mountain range peaks), and were influenced by settlement or transportation patterns. At various times, national borders with territories formerly controlled by other countries (British North America, New France, New Spain including Spanish Florida, and Russian America) became institutionalized as the borders of U.S. states. In the West, relatively arbitrary lines following latitude and longitude often prevail due to the sparseness of settlement west of the Mississippi River.

Once established, most state borders have, with few exceptions, been generally stable. Only two states, Missouri (Platte Purchase) and Nevada grew appreciably after statehood. Several of the original states ceded land, over a several-year period, to the Federal government, which in turn became the Northwest Territory, Southwest Territory, and Mississippi Territory. In 1791, Maryland and Virginia ceded land to create the District of Columbia (Virginia's portion was returned in 1847). In 1850, Texas ceded a large swath of land to the federal government. Additionally, Massachusetts and Virginia (on two occasions), have lost land, in each instance to form a new state.

There have been numerous other minor adjustments to state boundaries over the years due to improved surveys, resolution of ambiguous or disputed boundary definitions, or minor mutually agreed boundary adjustments for administrative convenience or other purposes. Occasionally, either Congress or the U.S. Supreme Court has had to settle state border disputes. One notable example is the case New Jersey v. New York, in which New Jersey won roughly 90% of Ellis Island from New York in 1998.

Once a territory is admitted by Congress as a state of the Union, the state must consent to any changes pertaining to the jurisdiction of that state and Congress. The only potential violation of this occurred when the legislature of Virginia declared the secession of Virginia from the United States at the start of the American Civil War and a newly formed alternative Virginia legislature, recognized by the federal government, consented to have West Virginia secede from Virginia.

=== Regional grouping ===
States may be grouped in regions; there are many variations and possible groupings. Many are defined in law or regulations by the federal government. For example, the United States Census Bureau defines four statistical regions, with nine divisions. The Census Bureau region definition (Northeast, Midwest, South, and West) is "widely used ... for data collection and analysis," and is the most commonly used classification system. Other multi-state regions are unofficial, and defined by geography or cultural affinity rather than by state lines.

== See also ==
- Insular area
- ISO 3166-2:US
- Lists of U.S. state topics
- Local government in the United States
- List of online encyclopedias of U.S. states, encyclopedias typically maintained by state historical societies, universities, or humanities councils
