= Anderson v. Creighton =

- Supreme Court of the United States

Argued February 23, 1987 Decided June 25, 1987
- Full case name: Russell Anderson, Petitioner v. Robert E. Creighton, Jr., et ux., et al.
- Citations: 483 U.S. 635 (more) 107 S. Ct. 3034, 97 L.Ed.2d 523

Case history
- Prior: 766 F.2d 1269 (8th Cir. 1985)

Holding
- 1. Petitioner is entitled to summary judgment on qualified immunity grounds if he can establish as a matter of law that a reasonable officer could have believed that the search comported with the Fourth Amendment, even though it actually did not. 2. There is no merit to respondents' argument that it is inappropriate to give officials alleged to have violated the Fourth Amendment -- and thus necessarily to have unreasonably searched or seized -- the protection of a qualified immunity intended only to protect reasonable official action.

Court membership
- Chief Justice William Rehnquist Associate Justices William J. Brennan Jr. · Byron White; Thurgood Marshall · Harry Blackmun; Lewis F. Powell Jr. · John P. Stevens; Sandra Day O'Connor · Antonin Scalia

Case opinions
- Majority: Scalia, joined by Rehnquist, White, Blackmun, Powell, O'Connor
- Dissent: Stevens, joined by Brennan, Marshall

Anderson v. Creighton, 483 U.S. 635 (1987), is a 1987 United States Supreme Court case concerning qualified immunity. In a 6–3 decision, the Court held that officers are entitled to qualified immunity from civil damages if they can demonstrate that a "reasonable officer" could have believed that their actions did not violate the United States Constitution, even if that belief was incorrect. The majority opinion, written by Justice Antonin Scalia, pointed to the requirement that an official be shown to have violated "clearly established" law in order to be ineligible for qualified immunity. Scalia's majority opinion then held that "[i]n order to conclude that the right which the official allegedly violated is "clearly established," the contours of the right must be sufficiently clear that a reasonable official would understand that what he is doing violates that right."
