= United States v. Stanley =

- Supreme Court of the United States

Argued April 21, 1987 Decided June 25, 1987
- Full case name: United States, et al. v. James B. Stanley
- Citations: 483 U.S. 669 (more) 107 S. Ct. 3054; 97 L. Ed. 2d 550; 1987 U.S. LEXIS 2890; 55 U.S.L.W. 5101
- Argument: Oral argument

Holding
- Servicemen may not maintain a Bivens action for injuries arising out of activity "incident to service."

Court membership
- Chief Justice William Rehnquist Associate Justices William J. Brennan Jr. · Byron White; Thurgood Marshall · Harry Blackmun; Lewis F. Powell Jr. · John P. Stevens; Sandra Day O'Connor · Antonin Scalia

Case opinions
- Majority: Scalia, joined by Rehnquist, White, Blackmun, Powell; Brennan, Marshall, Stevens, O'Connor (part I)
- Concur/dissent: Brennan, joined by Marshall; Stevens (part III)
- Concur/dissent: O'Connor

United States v. Stanley, 483 U.S. 669 (1987), was a United States Supreme Court case in which the Court held that a serviceman could not file a tort action against the federal government even though the government secretly administered doses of LSD to him as part of an experimental program, because his injuries were found by the lower court to be service-related.

== Background ==
In February 1958, James B. Stanley, a master sergeant in the Army stationed at Fort Knox, Kentucky, volunteered for a chemical warfare testing program. Stanley was administered lysergic acid diethylamide (LSD) in a US Army plan to test the effects of the drug on human subjects. Stanley claimed he was unknowingly given the drug.

Stanley claimed that as a result of the LSD exposure, he suffered from hallucinations, periods of incoherence, and memory loss due to his unawareness of having taken the drug. He suffered severe personality changes that led to his discharge and the dissolution of his marriage.

Stanley filed a lawsuit under the Federal Tort Claims Act (FTCA) alleging negligence in the administration, supervision, and subsequent monitoring of the experimental program.

The United States Court of Appeals for the Eleventh Circuit held that the serviceman could assert his claims under the FTCA and refused to dismiss the serviceman's Bivens claims.

== Opinion of the Court ==
After granting certiorari, the Supreme Court held that the circuit court had no jurisdiction to give orders to dismiss FTCA claims. The Supreme Court also held there was no Bivens claim for the serviceman's injuries because the lower court ruled the injuries occurred during Stanley's military service.

The majority argued that "a test for liability that depends on the extent to which particular suits would call into question military discipline and decision making would itself require judicial inquiry into, and hence intrusion upon, military matters." In dissent, Justice William Brennan argued that the need to preserve military discipline should not protect the government from liability and punishment for serious violations of constitutional rights:

The medical trials at Nuremberg in 1947 deeply impressed upon the world that experimentation with unknowing human subjects is morally and legally unacceptable. The United States Military Tribunal established the Nuremberg Code as a standard against which to judge German scientists who experimented with human subjects... [I]n defiance of this principle, military intelligence officials [...] began surreptitiously testing chemical and biological materials, including LSD.

Justice Sandra Day O'Connor, writing a separate dissent, stated:

No judicially crafted rule should insulate from liability the involuntary and unknowing human experimentation alleged to have occurred in this case. Indeed, as Justice Brennan observes, the United States played an instrumental role in the criminal prosecution of Nazi officials who experimented with human subjects during the Second World War, and the standards that the Nuremberg Military Tribunals developed to judge the behavior of the defendants stated that the 'voluntary consent of the human subject is absolutely essential [...] to satisfy moral, ethical, and legal concepts.' If this principle is violated, the very least that society can do is to see that the victims are compensated, as best they can be, by the perpetrators.

== Aftermath ==
In 1994 Congress passed a private claims bill to redress the case. In 1996 an arbitration panel awarded Stanley $400,577 (the maximum amount allowed under the bill) after a 2-1 vote.
