= Rivera v. Minnich =

- Supreme Court of the United States

Decided June 25, 1987
- Full case name: Rivera v. Minnich
- Citations: 483 U.S. 574 (more)

Holding
- The standard of proof in a paternity action need not be higher than the preponderance of the evidence.

Court membership
- Chief Justice William Rehnquist Associate Justices William J. Brennan Jr. · Byron White; Thurgood Marshall · Harry Blackmun; Lewis F. Powell Jr. · John P. Stevens; Sandra Day O'Connor · Antonin Scalia

Case opinions
- Majority: Stevens
- Concurrence: O'Connor
- Dissent: Brennan

Rivera v. Minnich, 483 U.S. 574 (1987), was a United States Supreme Court case in which the court held that the standard of proof in a paternity action need not be higher than the preponderance of the evidence.

== Background ==
Minnich, an unmarried mother, filed a child support suit in a Pennsylvania court against Rivera, alleging that he was the child's father. The judge denied Rivera's pretrial motion seeking a ruling that the Due Process Clause of the Fourteenth Amendment was violated by a state statute providing that the burden of proving paternity "shall be by a preponderance of the evidence," and requesting a jury instruction that paternity must be established by clear and convincing evidence. Applying the preponderance standard, the jury found that appellant was the father, but the judge later reconsidered his ruling on the burden-of-proof issue and granted Rivera's motion for a new trial. The Pennsylvania Supreme Court held the statute constitutional and reinstated the jury's verdict.

== Opinion of the court ==
The Supreme Court issued an opinion on June 25, 1987.
