= List of United States Supreme Court cases, volume 127 =

Supreme Court of the United States
- Interactive map of Supreme Court of the United States
- 38°53′26″N 77°00′16″W
- Established: March 4, 1789; 237 years ago
- Location: Washington, D.C.
- Coordinates: 38°53′26″N 77°00′16″W
- Composition method: Presidential nomination with Senate confirmation
- Authorised by: Constitution of the United States, Art. III, § 1
- Judge term length: life tenure, subject to impeachment and removal
- Number of positions: 9 (by statute)
- Website: supremecourt.gov

This is a list of cases reported in volume 127 of United States Reports, decided by the Supreme Court of the United States in 1888.

== Justices of the Supreme Court at the time of volume 127 U.S. ==
The Supreme Court is established by Article III, Section 1 of the Constitution of the United States, which says: "The judicial Power of the United States, shall be vested in one supreme Court . . .". The size of the Court is not specified; the Constitution leaves it to Congress to set the number of justices. Under the Judiciary Act of 1789 Congress originally fixed the number of justices at six (one chief justice and five associate justices). Since 1789 Congress has varied the size of the Court from six to seven, nine, ten, and back to nine justices (always including one chief justice).

Chief Justice Morrison Waite died in March 1888 and his successor, Melville Fuller, did not join the Court until October 1888; consequently, when the cases in volume 127 U.S. were decided the Court comprised the following eight members:

| Portrait | Justice | Office | Home State | Succeeded | Date confirmed by the Senate (Vote) | Tenure on Supreme Court |
|---|---|---|---|---|---|---|
| | Samuel Freeman Miller | Associate Justice | Iowa | Peter Vivian Daniel | July 16, 1862 (Acclamation) | July 21, 1862 – October 13, 1890 (Died) |
| | Stephen Johnson Field | Associate Justice | California | newly created seat | March 10, 1863 (Acclamation) | May 10, 1863 – December 1, 1897 (Retired) |
| | Joseph P. Bradley | Associate Justice | New Jersey | newly created seat | March 21, 1870 (46–9) | March 23, 1870 – January 22, 1892 (Died) |
| | John Marshall Harlan | Associate Justice | Kentucky | David Davis | November 29, 1877 (Acclamation) | December 10, 1877 – October 14, 1911 (Died) |
| | Stanley Matthews | Associate Justice | Ohio | Noah Haynes Swayne | May 12, 1881 (24–23) | May 17, 1881 – March 22, 1889 (Died) |
| | Horace Gray | Associate Justice | Massachusetts | Nathan Clifford | December 20, 1881 (51–5) | January 9, 1882 – September 15, 1902 (Died) |
| | Samuel Blatchford | Associate Justice | New York | Ward Hunt | March 22, 1882 (Acclamation) | April 3, 1882 – July 7, 1893 (Died) |
| | Lucius Quintus Cincinnatus Lamar | Associate Justice | Mississippi | William Burnham Woods | January 16, 1888 (32–28) | January 18, 1888 – January 23, 1893 (Died) |

== Citation style ==
Under the Judiciary Act of 1789 the federal court structure at the time comprised District Courts, which had general trial jurisdiction; Circuit Courts, which had mixed trial and appellate (from the US District Courts) jurisdiction; and the United States Supreme Court, which had appellate jurisdiction over the federal District and Circuit courts—and for certain issues over state courts. The Supreme Court also had limited original jurisdiction (i.e., in which cases could be filed directly with the Supreme Court without first having been heard by a lower federal or state court). There were one or more federal District Courts and/or Circuit Courts in each state, territory, or other geographical region.

Bluebook citation style is used for case names, citations, and jurisdictions.

- "C.C.D." = United States Circuit Court for the District of . . .
  - e.g.,"C.C.D.N.J." = United States Circuit Court for the District of New Jersey
- "D." = United States District Court for the District of . . .
  - e.g.,"D. Mass." = United States District Court for the District of Massachusetts
- "E." = Eastern; "M." = Middle; "N." = Northern; "S." = Southern; "W." = Western
  - e.g.,"C.C.S.D.N.Y." = United States Circuit Court for the Southern District of New York
  - e.g.,"M.D. Ala." = United States District Court for the Middle District of Alabama
- "Ct. Cl." = United States Court of Claims
- The abbreviation of a state's name alone indicates the highest appellate court in that state's judiciary at the time.
  - e.g.,"Pa." = Supreme Court of Pennsylvania
  - e.g.,"Me." = Supreme Judicial Court of Maine

== List of cases in volume 127 U.S. ==
| Case Name | Page & year | Opinion of the Court | Concurring opinion(s) | Dissenting opinion(s) | Lower Court | Disposition |
|---|---|---|---|---|---|---|
| California v. Central P.R.R. Co. | 1 (1888) | Bradley | none | none | C.C.N.D. Cal. | affirmed |
| Providence et al. Co. v. Clare's Adm'x | 45 (1888) | Blatchford | none | none | C.C.S.D.N.Y. | reversed |
| United States v. Weld | 51 (1888) | Lamar | none | none | Ct. Cl. | affirmed |
| Robards v. Lamb | 58 (1888) | Harlan | none | none | Mo. | affirmed |
| Morgan v. Eggers | 63 (1888) | Harlan | none | none | C.C.D. Ind. | affirmed |
| Page v. United States | 67 (1888) | Blatchford | none | none | Ct. Cl. | affirmed |
| More v. Steinbach | 70 (1888) | Field | none | none | C.C.D. Cal. | affirmed |
| Rucker v. Wheeler | 85 (1888) | Harlan | none | none | C.C.D. Colo. | affirmed |
| Blacklock v. Small | 96 (1888) | Blatchford | none | none | C.C.D.S.C. | reversed |
| Smith v. Bourbon Cnty. | 105 (1888) | Matthews | none | none | C.C.D. Kan. | decree modified |
| Lawrence v. Merritt | 113 (1888) | Miller | none | none | C.C.S.D.N.Y. | affirmed |
Tissue paper primarily used for making letterpress copies of letters or written matter was not subject to duty as "printing paper" under Schedule M, § 2504 Revised Statutes when imported into the United States. Instead, it was subject to duty as "other paper not otherwise provided for."
| Marye v. Baltimore & O.R.R. Co. | 117 (1888) | Matthews | none | none | C.C.W.D. Va. | affirmed |
| United States v. J.C. Irwin & Co. | 125 (1888) | Matthews | none | none | Ct. Cl. | reversed |
| Gleason v. District of Columbia | 133 (1888) | Miller | none | none | Ct. Cl. | affirmed |
| Kelley & A. v. Town of Milan | 139 (1888) | Blatchford | none | none | C.C.W.D. Tenn. | affirmed |
| Norton v. Town of Dyersburg | 160 (1888) | Blatchford | none | none | C.C.W.D. Tenn. | affirmed |
| Forncrook v. Root | 176 (1888) | Blatchford | none | none | C.C.N.D. Ohio | affirmed |
| United States v. Louisiana | 182 (1888) | Blatchford | none | none | Ct. Cl. | reversed |
| Whitbeck v. Mercantile Nat'l Bank | 193 (1888) | Miller | none | none | C.C.N.D. Ohio | affirmed |
| Peoria & P.U. Ry. Co. v. Chicago et al. R.R. Co. | 200 (1888) | Gray | none | none | C.C.N.D. Ill. | affirmed |
| Missouri P. Ry. Co. v. Mackey | 205 (1888) | Field | none | none | Kan. | affirmed |
| Minneapolis & S.L. Ry. Co. v. Herrick | 210 (1888) | Field | none | none | Minn. | affirmed |
| United States v. Broadhead | 212 (1888) | Miller | none | none | C.C.D. Cal. | dismissed |
| Jones's Adm'r v. Craig | 213 (1888) | Miller | none | none | C.C.D. Neb. | dismissed |
| De Saussure v. Gaillard | 216 (1888) | Matthews | none | none | S.C. | dismissed |
| Porter v. White | 235 (1888) | Blatchford | none | none | Sup. Ct. D.C. | affirmed |
| Bayard v. United States ex rel. White | 246 (1888) | Blatchford | none | none | Sup. Ct. D.C. | reversed |
| United States ex rel. Angarica v. Bayard | 251 (1888) | Blatchford | none | none | Sup. Ct. D.C. | affirmed |
| Cornell v. Weidner | 261 (1888) | Gray | none | none | C.C.E.D. Mich. | affirmed |
| Wisconsin v. Pelican Ins. Co. | 265 (1888) | Gray | none | none | original | judgment for defendant |
| Colton v. Colton | 300 (1888) | Matthews | none | none | C.C.D. Cal. | reversed |
| Cameron v. Hodges | 322 (1888) | Miller | none | none | C.C.W.D. Tenn. | reversed |
| Culbertson v. H. Witbeck Co. | 326 (1888) | Miller | none | none | C.C.W.D. Mich. | affirmed |
| United States v. Beebe | 338 (1888) | Lamar | none | none | C.C.E.D. Ark. | affirmed |
| Noyes v. Mantle | 348 (1888) | Field | none | none | Sup. Ct. Mont. | affirmed |
| Mosler et al. Co. v. Mosler B. & Co. | 354 (1888) | Blatchford | none | none | C.C.S.D. Ohio | affirmed |
| Herrman v. Arthur's Ex'rs | 363 (1888) | Blatchford | none | none | C.C.S.D.N.Y. | reversed |
| Hendy v. Golden State et al. Works | 370 (1888) | Blatchford | none | none | C.C.D. Cal. | affirmed |
| St. Paul P.W. v. Starling | 376 (1888) | Gray | none | none | C.C.D. Minn. | dismissal denied |
| Arkansas V.S. Co. v. Belden M. Co. | 379 (1888) | Gray | none | none | C.C.D. Colo. | affirmed |
| Mosher v. St Louis et al. Ry. Co. | 390 (1888) | Gray | none | none | C.C.E.D. Mo. | affirmed |
| Holland v. Shipley | 396 (1888) | Gray | none | none | C.C.S.D. Ohio | affirmed |
| Hosford v. Germania F. Ins. Co. | 399 (1888) | Gray | none | none | C.C.D. Neb. | reversed |
| Hosford v. Hartford F. Ins. Co. | 404 (1888) | Gray | none | none | C.C.D. Neb. | reversed |
| Chicago et al. Ry. Co. v. United States | 406 (1888) | Field | none | none | Ct. Cl. | affirmed |
| Barnard v. District of Columbia | 409 (1888) | Field | none | none | Ct. Cl. | affirmed |
| Ratterman v. Western Union T. Co. | 411 (1888) | Miller | none | none | C.C.S.D. Ohio | affirmed |
| United States v. McLaughlin | 428 (1888) | Bradley | none | none | C.C.N.D. Cal. | affirmed |
| Benson v. McMahon | 457 (1888) | Miller | none | none | C.C.S.D.N.Y. | affirmed |
| Glacier Mt. S.M. Co. v. Willis | 471 (1888) | Lamar | none | none | C.C.D. Colo. | reversed |
| Hegler v. Faulkner | 482 (1888) | Miller | none | none | C.C.D. Neb. | reversed |
| Jenkins v. International Bank | 484 (1888) | Matthews | none | none | Ill. | affirmed |
| Taylor v. Holmes | 489 (1888) | Miller | none | none | C.C.W.D.N.C. | affirmed |
| Freedman's et al. Co. v. Shepherd | 494 (1888) | Harlan | none | none | Sup. Ct. D.C. | affirmed |
| Robertson v. Sichel | 507 (1888) | Blatchford | none | none | C.C.S.D.N.Y. | reversed |
| Stuart v. Gay | 518 (1888) | Matthews | none | none | D.W. Va. | affirmed |
| Easton v. German A. Bank | 532 (1888) | Matthews | none | none | C.C.S.D.N.Y. | affirmed |
| Callan v. Wilson | 540 (1888) | Harlan | none | none | Sup. Ct. D.C. | reversed |
| Joyce v. Chillicothe et al. Co. | 557 (1888) | Blatchford | none | none | C.C.S.D. Ohio | affirmed |
| Flower v. City of Detroit | 563 (1888) | Blatchford | none | none | C.C.E.D. Mich. | affirmed |
| Arthur's Ex'rs v. Vietor | 572 (1888) | Blatchford | none | none | C.C.S.D.N.Y. | reversed |
| Brown v. District of Columbia | 579 (1888) | Lamar | none | none | Ct. Cl. | affirmed |
| Allen v. Gillette | 589 (1888) | Lamar | none | none | C.C.E.D. Tex. | affirmed |
| Falk v. Moebs | 597 (1888) | Lamar | none | none | C.C.E.D. Mich. | affirmed |
| Robertson v. Downing, S. & Co. | 607 (1888) | Field | none | none | C.C.S.D.N.Y. | affirmed |
| St. Romes v. Levee et al. Co. | 614 (1888) | Bradley | none | none | C.C.E.D. La. | reversed |
| Robbins v. Rollins's Ex'rs | 622 (1888) | Bradley | none | none | Sup. Ct. D.C. | reversed |
| Calhoun v. Lanaux | 634 (1888) | Bradley | none | none | La. | affirmed |
| Leloup v. Port of Mobile | 640 (1888) | Bradley | none | none | Ala. | reversed |
| Farmers' L. & T. Co. v. Newman | 649 (1888) | Harlan | none | none | C.C.W.D. Mo. | reversed |
| Travellers' Ins. Co. v. McConkey | 661 (1888) | Harlan | none | none | C.C.N.D. Iowa | reversed |
| Nickerson v. Nickerson | 668 (1888) | Harlan | none | none | Sup. Ct. D.C. | affirmed |
| Powell v. Pennsylvania | 678 (1888) | Harlan | none | Field | Pa. | affirmed |
| Walker v. Pennsylvania | 699 (1888) | Harlan | none | none | Pa. | affirmed |
| Mahon v. Justice | 700 (1888) | Field | none | Bradley | C.C.D. Ky. | affirmed |
| Sewall v. Haymaker | 719 (1888) | Harlan | none | none | C.C.S.D. Ohio | reversed |
| In re Coy | 731 (1888) | Miller | none | Field | C.C.D. Ind. | affirmed |
| Craig v. Leitensdorfer | 764 (1888) | Miller | none | none | C.C.D. Colo. | order to pay costs |
| In re Burdett | 771 (1888) | Miller | none | none | C.C.E.D. Mich. | mandamus denied |
| Seagrist v. Crabtree | 773 (1888) | Miller | none | none | Sup. Ct. Terr. N.M. | dismissal denied |
| Hunt v. Blackburn | 774 (1888) | Miller | none | none | C.C.E.D. Ark. | continued |
| Marchand v. Livandais | 775 (1888) | Miller | none | none | C.C.E.D. La. | dismissal denied |
| Western et al. Co. v. McGillis | 776 (1888) | Miller | none | none | C.C.N.D. Ill. | bond order denied |
