= Ardeth Lake (California) =

- Location within California Location within the United States
- Location: Tuolumne County, California
- Coordinates: 38°03′05″N 119°41′30″W
- Type: Lake
- Surface elevation: 8,445 feet (2,574 m)

Ardeth Lake is a lake in Tuolumne County, California, in the United States.

Ardeth Lake was named for a Yosemite ranger's wife.

== See also ==
- List of lakes in California
