= Rankin v. McPherson =

- Supreme Court of the United States

Argued March 23, 1987 Decided June 24, 1987
- Full case name: Walter Rankin, et al. v. Ardith McPherson
- Citations: 483 U.S. 378 (more) 107 S.Ct. 2891; 97 L. Ed. 2d 315; 1987 U.S. LEXIS 2875; 55 U.S.L.W. 5019; 2 I.E.R. Cas. (BNA) 257

Case history
- Prior: Summary judgment for respondent granted, Civ. Action No. H-81-1442 (S.D. Tex. 1983); vacated and remanded, 736 F.2d 175 (5th Cir. 1984); judgement confirmed from the bench; reversed, 786 F.2d 1233 (5th Cir. 1986); cert. granted, 479 U.S. 913 (1986).

Holding
- Rankin's interest in discharging McPherson was outweighed by her rights under the First Amendment. The Court held that McPherson's statement, when considered in context, "plainly dealt with a matter of public concern."

Court membership
- Chief Justice William Rehnquist Associate Justices William J. Brennan Jr. · Byron White; Thurgood Marshall · Harry Blackmun; Lewis F. Powell Jr. · John P. Stevens; Sandra Day O'Connor · Antonin Scalia

Case opinions
- Majority: Marshall, joined by Brennan, Blackmun, Powell, Stevens
- Concurrence: Powell
- Dissent: Scalia, joined by Rehnquist, White, O'Connor

Laws applied
- U.S. Const. amend. I

Rankin v. McPherson, 483 U.S. 378 (1987), is a major decision of the Supreme Court of the United States concerning the First Amendment, specifically whether the protection of the First Amendment extends to government employees who make extremely critical remarks about the President. The Court ruled that, while direct threats on the President's life would not be protected speech, a comment — even an unpopular or seemingly extreme one — made on a matter of public interest and spoken by a government employee with no policymaking function and a job with little public interaction, would be protected.

== Background ==
Ardith McPherson was a deputy constable working in Texas' Harris County Constable's office. Despite her title of "deputy constable," she, as part of her normal duties, was not dispatched to act as a law enforcement official. Furthermore, her office did not have a telephone, the general public did not have easy access to her, and her regular activities were essentially all clerical in nature, such as data entry. She was a "deputy constable" simply by virtue of everyone working in the office being given that title.

McPherson had the radio on in her office, when she learned of an assassination attempt on Ronald Reagan, President of the United States at that time. During a conversation with another office worker, Lawrence Jackson, she remarked, "Shoot, if they go for him again, I hope they get him." This comment, unbeknownst to McPherson, had been overheard by another deputy constable, who had then reported what he heard to Constable Rankin, effectively in charge of all those in the office. He requested to speak with McPherson, who admitted to him what she had said, stating, "Yes, but I didn't mean anything by it." After the conversation, Constable Rankin terminated her employment.

=== Procedural history ===
After being fired, McPherson brought suit in the United States District Court for the Southern District of Texas, claiming that her constitutional rights had been violated by the dismissal, specifically her First Amendment right of free speech. She sued for reinstatement, backpay, costs and fees, and "equitable relief," likely related to her emotional distress at having been fired. The District Court granted summary judgment to Rankin, claiming that her speech was unprotected and her termination was entirely proper. McPherson appealed to the United States Court of Appeals for the Fifth Circuit, which ruled that the Southern District of Texas District Court should re-try the case, as "substantial issues of material fact regarding the context in which the statement had been made" precluded summary judgment.

On remand, the District Court again ruled that McPherson's statements did not fall under protected speech, which, once again, the Appellate Court reversed. In the Appellate Court's opinion, McPherson's comment had addressed a matter of "public concern," which required that a balancing consideration be invoked, weighing McPherson's free speech rights against the state's interest in maintaining "efficiency and discipline in the workplace." The Court of Appeals overturned the District Court's opinion, remanding the case to determine an appropriate remedy. The Supreme Court granted certiorari.

== Supreme Court ==
The opinion of the Court was delivered by Justice Marshall, joined by Justices Brennan, Blackmun, Powell and Stevens. The Court reasoned that even though McPherson was a probationary employee who could, as a condition of her hire, be fired for any reason the employer decided — even no reason at all — she deserved to be reinstated if she had been fired merely for exercising a right enshrined in the Constitution. Even though the state, as an employer, certainly has the right to determine certain modes of appropriate conduct among employees, the Court did not believe that this right balanced fairly against an employee's right to discuss matters of "public concern." The life or death of the President was deemed an obvious matter of public concern, which placed McPherson's comments into the realm of protected speech, further bolstered by the fact that her comment did not amount to a bona fide threat on the President's life. Just because a statement is incorrect, unpopular, or ill-advised, the Court determined, it does not mean it is beyond constitutional protection.

The Court also reasoned that McPherson's comment should not be considered "in a vacuum." That is to say, it should not be looked at as though she spoke her comment without any action precipitating it; rather, it must be taken in the context that surrounded the conversation in which it was said. Because of the context in which it was said (i.e., soon after learning of the failed assassination attempt) and because it did not appear to interfere with the efficient and orderly operation of office business, it was protected speech. The Fifth Circuit's decision was affirmed, effectively reversing the District Court's ruling and demanded the reinstatement of McPherson as well as the consideration for the damages she sought.

=== Concurring opinion ===
Justice Powell filed a separate concurrence noting the private nature of McPherson's conversation and its constitutionally protected status.

=== Dissenting opinion ===
Justice Scalia dissented, joined by Chief Justice Rehnquist and Justices White and O'Connor. In their dissent, the two-pronged test outlined in Connick v. Myers was thought to be impermissibly expanded in scope by the majority's decision. In this test, one must prove that the speech in question; 1. Was of a matter of public concern, and, 2. Bears greater concern in being said than the employer's concern in suppressing it.

The dissenting Justices felt that even though she claimed she "didn't mean anything by it," it did not actually address any kind of disapproval of the President's policies. Rather, they felt her comment was genuinely expressing the hope that, the next time an assassination was attempted, the President would be killed. The dissenters felt her statement included "violent words" rather than a genuine, albeit hyperbolic, attempt at criticism of the President's policies.

Also, the dissenting Justices felt it was improper for the majority to claim that McPherson's speech was at the "heart" of First Amendment protection when it was only slightly removed from a threat on the President's life, which had already been ruled as unprotected speech. As Scalia's dissent states, "Once McPherson stopped explicitly criticizing the President's policies and expressed a desire that he be assassinated, she crossed the line." He further quoted Petitioner Rankin's counsel that no law enforcement agency is required by the First Amendment to permit one of its employees to 'ride with the cops and cheer for the robbers'. The dissenting Justices expressed their belief that the balancing act proposed by the majority was misguided, and that, instead, it should have balanced McPherson's right to say it against the right of the Constable's Office to prevent such statements in his agency. It was stated that Rankin, as Constable, had a very understandable interest in preventing his employees from even sounding as though they advocated violent crimes in the office, and, as such, the dissenting Justices believed he had even greater weight in the balance.

== See also ==
- List of United States Supreme Court cases, volume 483
- List of United States Supreme Court cases
- List of United States Supreme Court cases involving the First Amendment
- Lists of United States Supreme Court cases by volume
- List of United States Supreme Court cases by the Rehnquist Court
