= Criminal law in the Taney Court =

Aspect of U.S. judicial history (1836–1864)

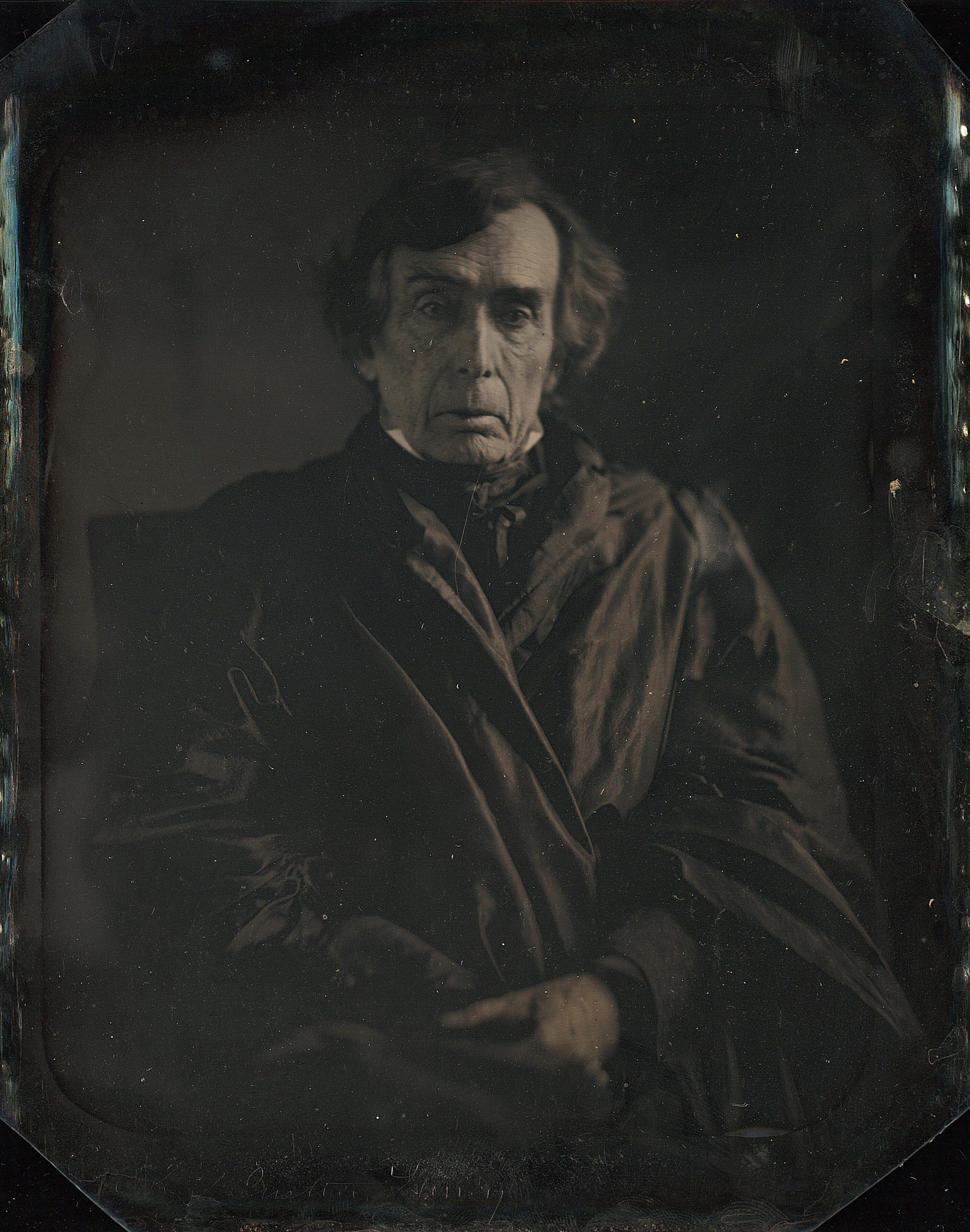
Chief Justice Roger B. Taney

The Taney Court (the Supreme Court of the United States under Chief Justice Roger B. Taney, 1836–1864) heard thirty criminal law cases, approximately one per year. Notable cases include Prigg v. Pennsylvania (1842), United States v. Rogers (1846), Ableman v. Booth (1858), Ex parte Vallandigham (1861), and United States v. Jackalow (1862).

Like its predecessor, the Taney Court exercised only limited appellate jurisdiction in criminal cases. Like its predecessor, it heard original habeas petitions, writs of error from the state courts, and certificates of division from the circuit courts. In addition, unlike its predecessor, the Court heard two writs of error from the territorial courts and three prerogative writs of mandamus and prohibition in criminal matters. The Court denied every petition for a prerogative writ that it received, habeas or otherwise.

== Background ==
The basic structure of the federal criminal system remained the same during Chief Justice Taney's tenure as it had been during Chief Justice Marshall's tenure. The Judiciary Act of 1789 divided original jurisdiction for the trial of federal crimes between the United States district courts and the United States circuit courts. The district courts were given jurisdiction over all federal crimes "where no other punishment than whipping, not exceeding thirty stripes, a fine not exceeding one hundred dollars, or a term of imprisonment not exceeding six months, is to be inflicted." The circuit courts were given concurrent jurisdiction over these crimes, and exclusive jurisdiction over all other federal crimes. The circuit courts also exercised appellate jurisdiction over the district courts, but only in civil cases.

The Judiciary Act of 1789 also placed the responsibility for prosecuting federal crimes in the United States Attorney for each United States federal judicial district. The Act provided that "there shall be appointed in each district" a "person learned in the law to act as attorney for the United States in such district, who shall be sworn or affirmed to the faithful execution of his office, whose duty it shall be to prosecute in such district all delinquents for crimes and offences, cognizable under the authority of the United States."

== Sources of jurisdiction ==
In Ex parte Gordon (1861), the Court summarized its jurisdiction in federal criminal cases thus:

[I]n criminal cases, the proceedings and judgment of the Circuit Court cannot be revised or controlled here, in any form of proceeding, either by writ of error or prohibition, and, consequently, we have no authority to examine them by a certiorari. And the only case in which this court is authorized even to express an opinion on the proceedings in a Circuit Court in a criminal case is, where the judges of the Circuit Court are opposed in opinion upon a question arising at the trial, and certify it to this court for its decision.

=== Writs of error ===
Although the Supreme Court could not issue writs of error to examine criminal convictions in the lower federal courts, it could issue such writs with regard to the state courts and territorial courts.

==== State courts ====
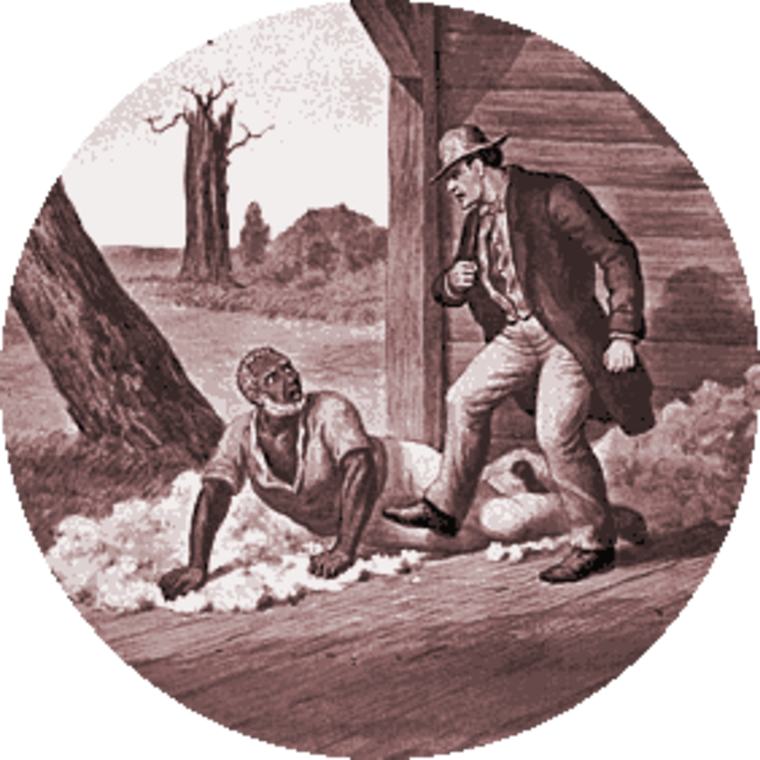
Four of the six criminal appeals from state courts involved slavery.

Pursuant to its power—under § 25 of the Judiciary Act of 1789—to review the judgments of state courts on federal questions by writs of error, the Marshall Court had twice reversed criminal convictions obtained pursuant to a criminal statute that violated the federal constitution.

The Taney Court continued this trend. In Prigg v. Pennsylvania (1842), the Court invalidating a state kidnapping conviction as in conflict with the Fugitive Slave Clause, which the Court found to authorize self-help. In Thurlow v. Massachusetts (1847), known as the License Cases, the Court invalidated state liquor laws. But, in Fox v. Ohio (1847), the Court sustained state counterfeiting statutes, even though the power to punish counterfeiting had been explicitly granted to Congress. (Note: "Congress shall have Power . . . To provide for the Punishment of counterfeiting the Securities and current Coin of the United States." U.S. Const. art. I, § 8, cl. 6.) And, in Moore v. Illinois (1852), the Court upheld state laws that punished those who harbored escaped slaves, even though the same conduct was punishable by the federal Fugitive Slave Act of 1850.

In United States v. Booth (1855) and Ableman v. Booth (1858), the Court held that state courts have no authority to issue writs of habeas corpus to free federal criminal defendants. Booth had been indicted under the federal Fugitive Slave Act.

==== Territorial courts ====
Article Four, Section Three, Clause Two of the Constitution provides that "The Congress shall have Power to dispose of and make all needful Rules and Regulations respecting the Territory". Pursuant to this authority, Congress had created territorial courts outside of the Article Three courts established by the Judiciary Act of 1789 and its progeny. Although the Marshall Court had heard some civil appeals from the territorial courts, no criminal appealed had been attempted.

In Forsyth v. United States (1850) and Simpson v. United States (1850), the Court held that its authority to hear writs of error from the Florida territorial courts—which was defined by the organic statute of those courts—extended to criminal cases. Forsyth and Simpson found invalid criminal cases transferred of criminal cases which had begun with indictments by grand juries in the territorial courts and then been transferred to the newly created state courts within re-indictment.

=== Original habeas ===
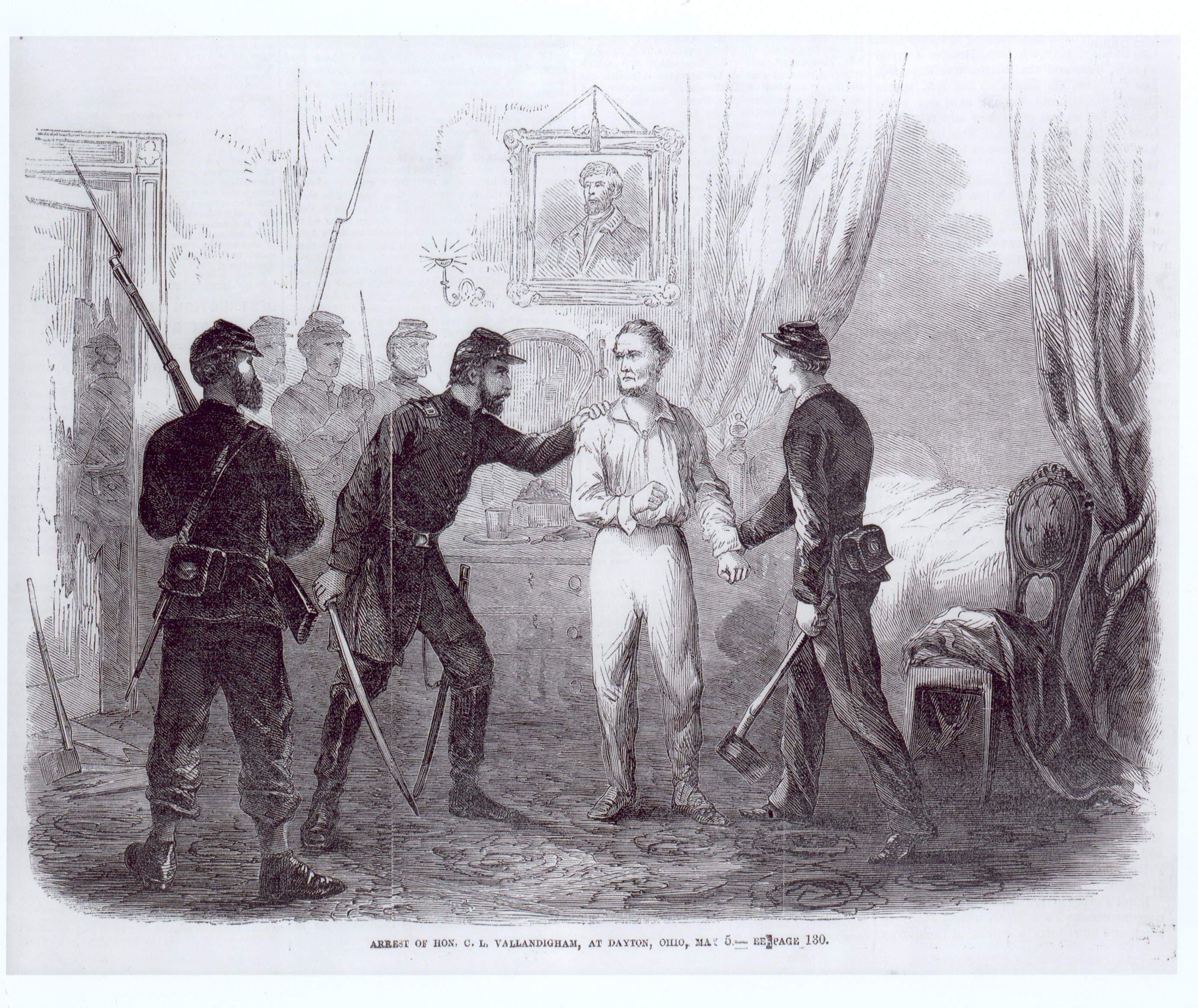
The arrest of former Congressman Clement Vallandigham (D-OH)

The Marshall Court had heard six original habeas petitions in criminal matters, all involving the United States Circuit Court of the District of Columbia. Its precedents established that the Court could grant the writ in pre-conviction situations, but could not grant the writ in post-conviction situations, unless the sentence of conviction had run.

The Taney Court heard seven additional such petitions. In Ex parte Wells (1855), over the dissents of Judges Curtis and Campbell, the Court affirmed the holding of the Marshall Court that original habeas petitions were a constitutionally permissible exercise of the Court's appellate jurisdiction. (Note: "In all Cases affecting Ambassadors, other public Ministers and Consuls, and those in which a State shall be Party, the supreme Court shall have original Jurisdiction." U.S. Const. art. III, § 2, cl. 2. Marbury v. Madison had held that the original jurisdiction granted to the Supreme Court by Article Three of the Constitution could not be expanded. 5 U.S. (1 Cranch) 137, 173–75 (1803).)

In Ex parte Dorr (1845), the Court held that it had no power to issue the writ to state prisoners serving sentences pursuant to a state conviction (except for the limited purpose of obtaining their in-court testimony). (Note: Section 14 of the Judiciary Act of 1789, which authorized original habeas petitions, provided that: "writs of habeas corpus shall in no case extend to prisoners in gaol, unless where they are in custody, under or by colour of the authority of the United States, or are committed for trial before some court of the same, or are necessary to be brought into court to testify." Judiciary Act of 1789, § 14, 1 Stat. 73, 81–82.) The holding of Dorr was abrogated by a Reconstruction-era statute granting federal courts the power to grant writs of habeas corpus to state prisoners.

In In re Metzger (1847), the Court held that it had no original habeas jurisdiction to review the case of a prisoner held in custody pursuant to the order of a district judge, awaiting foreign extradition. In In re Kaine (1852), by a 5-3 decision, the Court extended this holding under the 1848 extradition act which authorized commissions to play part of the role previously exercised by a district judge.

In Ex parte Gordon (1861), the Court held that it had no original habeas jurisdiction to review a post-conviction sentence of death.

In Ex parte Vallandigham (1863), the Court held that it had no original habeas jurisdiction to review the judgements of military commissions; because the military courts were not one of the courts authorized to consider habeas petitions by § 14 of the Judiciary Act of 1789, any such jurisdiction would be constitutionally original rather than appellate, and thus unconstitutional.

=== Certificates of division ===
The Marshall Court heard thirty-one criminal cases under the certificate of division procedure authorized by § 6 of the Judiciary Act of 1802. However, the Court had held that the sufficiency of the evidence could not be certified—whether on a motion for a new trial or a motion for a directed verdict. In United States v. Briggs (Briggs I) (1847), the Court further limited its jurisdiction to hear criminal certificates of division by holding that the question of whether a demurrer to an indictment should be sustained was too general to be certified.

=== Other prerogative writs ===
Prior to the Taney Court, no reported decision recorded an attempt by a party to obtain review in a criminal case by means of a prerogative writ other than habeas corpus. In Ex parte Gordon (1861), the court held that it had no power to issue a writ of prohibition to examine a death sentence issued by an admiralty court for piracy (the Court did possess the power to issue writs of prohibition in civil admiralty cases).

The Taney Court also heard and rejected to petitions for mandamus in criminal cases. In Ex parte Taylor (1852), denied a petition on the merits, holding that federal bail in D.C. depended on federal law, not Maryland law. In Kentucky v. Dennison (1861), the Court denied another mandamus petition, holding that—even though the Extradition Clause of the Constitution obliged states to extradite criminals to other states for trial—this provision was not enforceable in the federal courts. Dennison was overruled by Puerto Rico v. Branstad (1987).

== Defining federal crimes ==
=== Counterfeiting ===
Section 20 of the Crimes Act of 1825 prohibiting counterfeiting. In United States v. Marigold (1850), the Court held that this was a Constitutional exercise of Congress's power to punish counterfeiting.

=== Indian country ===
Section 25 of the Nonintercourse Act of 1834 provided federal crimes governing areas under exclusive federal jurisdiction would apply in Indian country, with an exception for Indian-on-Indian crimes. In United States v. Rogers (1846), the Court held that the exception did not apply to defendants who were white persons who were adopted by Indians.

=== Naval timber ===
An 1831 statute prohibited the taking of trees reserved for the use of the United States—specifically, "any life oak or red cedar tree or trees, or other timber". In United States v. Briggs (Briggs II) (1850), the Court held that the "other timber" language was not limited to trees used for naval purposes, even though that was the purpose of the statute.

=== Shipwreck theft ===
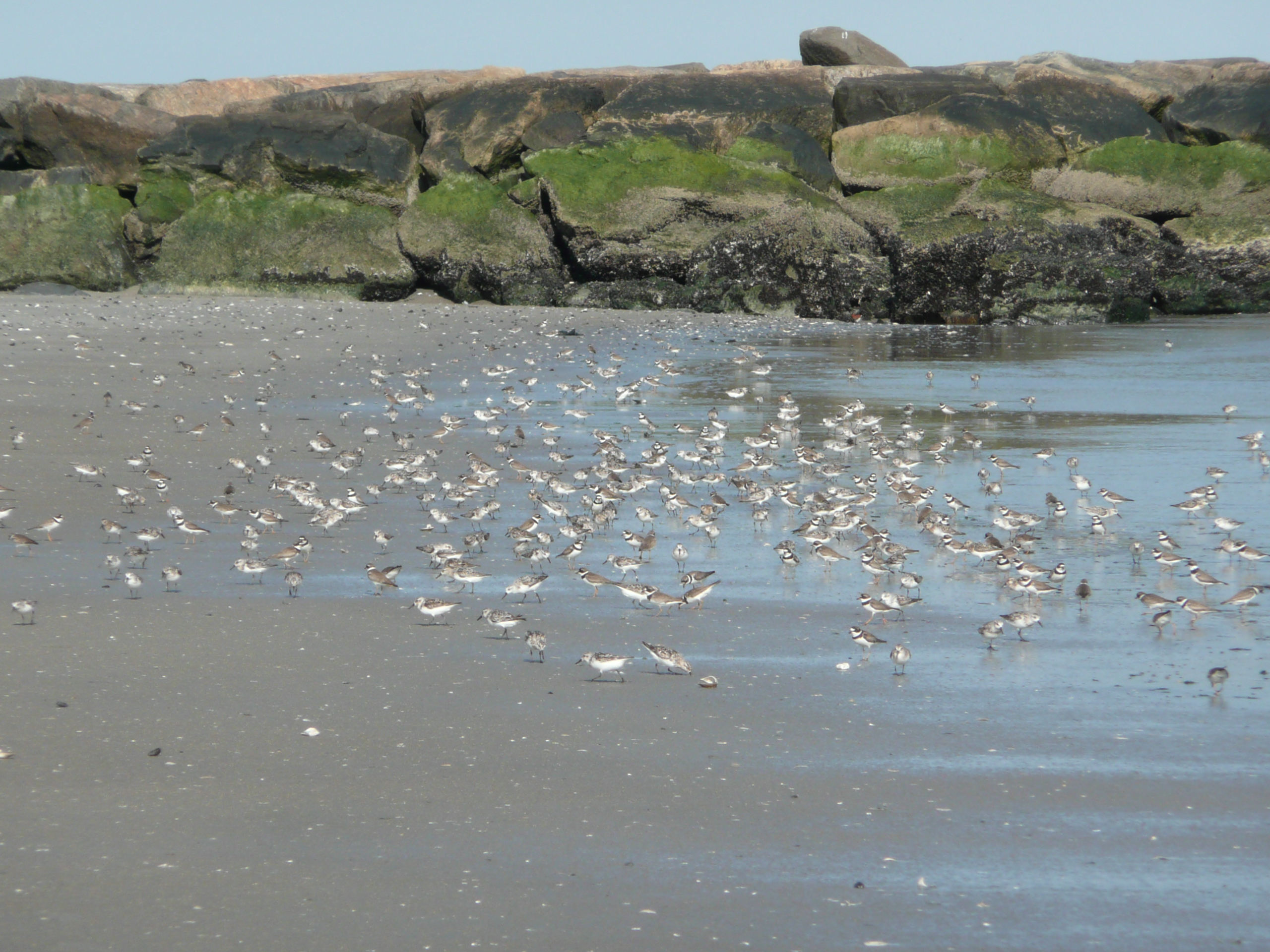
Coombs involved theft from a beached vessel on Rockaway Beach (pictured).

Section 9 of the Crimes Act of 1825 prohibited removing goods from a wrecked ship "within the admiralty or maritime jurisdiction of the United States". In United States v. Coombs (1838), the Court held that the act did not extend to a defendant who had purloined several textile goods from a beached boat above the high tide line because there was no federal criminal admiralty jurisdiction beyond that point.

=== Slave trading ===
The Slave Trade Act of 1800 prohibited U.S. citizens from participating in the international slave trade. In United States v. Morris (1840), the Court held that the offense could be charged even if the vessel—fitted out for slave trading—was apprehended before slaves were taken aboard.

== Criminal procedure ==
In United States v. Reid (1851), the Court held that § 34 of the Judiciary Act of 1789—also known as the Rules of Decision Act (RDA)—applied only in civil, not criminal, cases. Whereas the RDA would have incorporated post-1789 changes in state law, the Court held instead that the Judiciary Act of 1789 adopted state rules of criminal procedure as they exited in 1789, unless inconsistent with a more specific federal statute.

=== Constitutional issues ===
==== Double jeopardy ====
In the Taney Court, for the first time, the Court was asked to apply the criminal provisions of the Bill of Rights to the states. In Fox v. Ohio (1847) and Moore v. Illinois (1852), the Court reject the argument that the Double Jeopardy Clause was violated by permitting the state and federal government to criminalize the same conduct (which could hypothetically lead to duplicative prosecutions). Justice McLean dissented in both cases on constitutional grounds. The Court was not called on to consider a case in which dual prosecution had actually occurred.

In United States v. Nickerson (1854), a federal case, the Court held that a second indictment after acquittal should be dismissed because of double jeopardy. The statute at issue punished false statements on an application for a subsidy for cod fishing vessels. The defendant had submitted multiple false statements. The issue was whether the first indictment—which referred only to statements required by the subsidy statute—reached all the statements named in the second indictment. The Court held that all the statements were required by the statute and thus prior jeopardy barred the second prosecution.

==== Vicinage ====
United States v. Dawson (1854) concerned a murder committed in the Indian Territory by a non-Indian defendant, a crime which by statute was triable in Arkansas. Between the murder and the trial, the District of Arkansas had been subdivided into the Eastern and Western Districts of Arkansas. The Court held that the Vicinage Clause of the Sixth Amendment, which requires a jury drawn from the state and district wherein the crime was committed, had no application to crimes committed outside of a U.S. state.

==== Venue ====
Article Three, Section Two, Clause Three of the Constitution provides: "The Trial of all Crimes ... shall be held in the State where the said Crimes shall have been committed; but when not committed within any State, the Trial shall be at such Place or Places as the Congress may by Law have directed."

In United States v. Jackalow (1861), the Court held that Article Three venue must be established by facts found by a jury. The act of piratical murder by Jackalow was alleged to have occurred on the high seas, between the waters within the jurisdiction of the states of New York and Connecticut; New Jersey was the first state into which Jackalow was brought upon capture. An 1820 anti-piracy statute provided that, if the crime occurred on the high seas, venue was proper in the first state into which the defendant was brought after capture. The Court held that—although the boundary of New York and Connecticut state waters were a question of law for the judge—the location of the crime was a question of fact for the jury. Thus, Jackalow was granted a new trial.

=== Evidence ===
==== Best evidence ====
In United States v. Wood (1840), the Court held that the false statement (in connection with customs) could be proved up by the entries in the customs house logs, as opposed to testimony, without violating the best evidence rule.

==== Competence ====
In United States v. Murphy (1842), the Court held that a victim of theft was competent to testify in a criminal theft prosecution because the victim is not formally an interested party; even if the victim might later file a civil suit, any fine or forfeiture would pass to the government.

In United States v. Reid (1851), the Court held that a jointly-indicted, separately-tried codefendant was not competent to be called as a witness.

=== Other ===
==== Sufficiency of an indictment ====
In United States v. Hardyman (1839), the Court held that an indictment for knowingly possessing treasury notes stolen from the mail was insufficient if it misdescribed the interest rate printed on the note. In United States v. Staats (1850), the Court held that an indictment for fraud need not charge "felonious intent" in addition to fraudulent intent.

==== External influence on jury ====
In United States v. Reid (1851), the Court held harmless the fact that two jurors had read a newspaper article that summarized the evidence in the case, determining that the newspaper article did not influence the verdict.

==== Clemency ====
In Ex parte Wells (1855), the Court held that the President has the power to grant a conditional pardon (i.e. the power to commute a sentence of death to life imprisonment); Judge McLean dissented on the merits. (Note: "The President ... shall have Power to Grant Reprieves and Pardons for Offenses against the United States, except in Cases of Impeachment." U.S. Const. art. II, § 2, cl. 1.)

==== Prosecutorial peremptory challenges ====
The Crimes Act of 1790 gave 20 peremptory challenges to capital defendants and 35 to treason defendants. An 1840 statute provided that federal jury selection should follow state procedures in the absence of a more specific federal statute. In United States v. Shackleford (1855), the Court held that—with regard to peremptory challenges by prosecutors in capital and treason cases—the Crimes Act controlled, and thus prosecutors were to be given no peremptory challenges, even if they would have such challenges under the laws of the relevant state. Ten years later, Congress abrogated Shackleford, granting prosecutors five peremptory challenges in treason and capital cases (and two in non-capital felony cases); the 1865 act left the defendant's number of peremptory challenges unchanged.
