= List of United States Supreme Court cases, volume 483 =

This is a list of all United States Supreme Court cases from volume 483 of the United States Reports:

Case name	Citation	Date decided
Ricketts v. Adamson	483 U.S. 1	1987
Citicorp Industrial Credit, Inc. v. Brock	483 U.S. 27	1987
Rock v. Arkansas	483 U.S. 44	1987
Sumner v. Shuman	483 U.S. 66	1987
Commissioner v. Fink	483 U.S. 89	1987
Tanner v. United States	483 U.S. 107	1987
Agency Holding Corp. v. Malley-Duff & Associates, Inc.	483 U.S. 143	1987
Bourjaily v. United States	483 U.S. 171	1987
South Dakota v. Dole	483 U.S. 203	1987
Puerto Rico v. Branstad	483 U.S. 219	1987
Tyler Pipe Industries, Inc. v. Washington State Dept. of Revenue	483 U.S. 232	1987
American Trucking Assns., Inc. v. Scheiner	483 U.S. 266	1987
California v. Rooney	483 U.S. 307	1987
Corporation of Presiding Bishop of Church of Jesus Christ of Latter-day Saints v. Amos	483 U.S. 327	1987
McNally v. United States	483 U.S. 350	1987
Rankin v. McPherson	483 U.S. 378	1987
Buchanan v. Kentucky	483 U.S. 402	1987
Solorio v. United States	483 U.S. 435	1987
Welch v. Texas Dept. of Highways and Public Transp.	483 U.S. 468	1987
San Francisco Arts & Athletics, Inc. v. United States Olympic Comm.	483 U.S. 522	1987
Rivera v. Minnich	483 U.S. 574	1987
Bowen v. Gilliard	483 U.S. 587	1987
Anderson v. Creighton	483 U.S. 635	1987
United States v. Stanley	483 U.S. 669	1987
Pennsylvania v. Delaware Valley Citizens' Council for Clean Air	483 U.S. 711	1987
Greer v. Miller	483 U.S. 756	1987
Burger v. Kemp	483 U.S. 776	1987
Nollan v. California Coastal Comm'n	483 U.S. 825	1987
Griffin v. Wisconsin	483 U.S. 868	1987
Deaver v. United States	483 U.S. 1301	1987
Bowen v. Kendrick	483 U.S. 1304	1987
American Trucking Assns., Inc. v. Gray	483 U.S. 1306	1987
