= Briscoe v. Bank of Kentucky =

- Supreme Court of the United States

Decided February 11, 1837
- Full case name: John Briscoe and others v. The President and Directors of the Bank of the Commonwealth of Kentucky
- Citations: 36 U.S. 257 (more) 11 Pet. 257

Holding
- The Bank of Kentucky's issuance of banknotes does not violate the Constitution.

Court membership
- Chief Justice Roger B. Taney Associate Justices Joseph Story · Smith Thompson; John McLean · Henry Baldwin; James M. Wayne · Philip P. Barbour

Case opinions
- Majority: McLean, joined by Taney, Thompson, Baldwin, Wayne, Barbour
- Concurrence: Thompson
- Concurrence: Baldwin
- Dissent: Story

Laws applied
- Article I, Section 10 of the U.S. Constitution

Briscoe v. Bank of Kentucky, 36 U.S. (11 Pet.) 257 (1837), was a decision of the Supreme Court of the United States involving the intersection of states' rights and monetary policy. In an opinion by Justice John McLean, the Court held that a bank under the de facto control of the state of Kentucky could issue banknotes without violating a provision of the Constitution that forbade states from issuing "bills of credit". The 6–1 decision demonstrated the Taney Court's support for Jacksonian principles of states' rights and opposition to federal control of banking.

== Background ==
A provision of the Constitution forbids the states from issuing "bills of credit", coining specie, or making "any Thing but gold and silver Coin a Tender in Payment of Debts". Coins were cumbersome, and they were often in short supply in the West; as such, the states searched for ways to sidestep the constitutional prohibition. In 1820, the state of Kentucky established the Bank of the Commonwealth of Kentucky and authorized it to issue and circulate banknotes. The bank's officials were selected by the Kentucky legislature; its stock was wholly owned by the state; all state funds were deposited into the bank; its dividends were placed into the state treasury. The bank loaned the banknotes it had issued, which could also be used to pay state taxes, to borrowers.

John Briscoe took out a loan from the bank and received payment in banknotes. He defaulted, and the bank sued to collect the debt. Briscoe maintained that the banknotes were bills of credit since they were only pieces of paper whose value stemmed from the state's full faith and credit. He argued that, since the bank was in effect an agent of the state, its issuance of banknotes was unconstitutional. The bank's attorney, Henry Clay, was tasked with explaining why the Court's recent decision in Craig v. Missouri (1830), in which a 4–3 majority had struck down loan certificates issued by Missouri as unconstitutional bills of credit, did not foreclose his arguments. He argued that the bank was not part of the state but instead a separate corporation to which the constitutional prohibition did not apply.

The Kentucky courts ruled in the bank's favor, and Briscoe appealed to the Supreme Court, citing Craig. The case was argued in 1835. A narrow majority of the Court was inclined to reach the same conclusion as in Craig, but the justices did not want to rule on the constitutional question until the vacancy created by Justice Gabriel Duvall's resignation had been filled. The death of Chief Justice John Marshall later that year reduced the number of available justices further. A newly reconstituted Court, on which all but two justices were appointees of President Andrew Jackson, reheard the case in 1837. Only a single justice from the Craig majority – Justice Joseph Story – remained on the bench.

== Decision ==
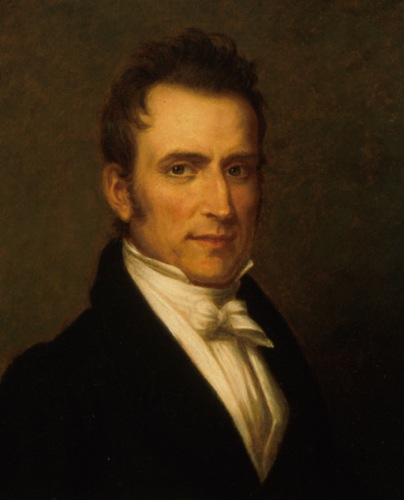
Justice John McLean delivered the opinion of the Court in Briscoe.

The Court rendered its decision on February 11, 1837. By a 6–1 vote, the justices ruled in favor of the bank, upholding Kentucky's law. Justice John McLean, who had dissented in Craig, delivered the majority opinion. He opined that no previous case had "exceeded", and few had "equalled, the importance of that which arises in this case". McLean admitted that the bank had a strong connection to the state, but, observing that the bank could be sued independently of the state, he concluded that the bank's notes were not backed by the state's credit: they were instead the banknotes of a private corporation that simply happened to be owned by a state. He expressed concern that a ruling against Kentucky could render unconstitutional the banknotes issued by many other states. Although the majority did not reverse Craig directly, some scholars have argued that it effectively overruled the decision. Justices Smith Thompson and Henry Baldwin each filed separate concurring opinions.

The sole dissenter, Justice Story, filed an animated and lengthy opinion. Writing that the bank was "the sole and exclusive instrument of the State, managing its exclusive funds, for its exclusive benefit and under its exclusive management", he concluded that the bank was for all intents and purposes a part of the state, and thus in his view the banknotes were impermissible state currency. He argued that states could not lawfully permit others to do what they could not do themselves. Story, the protégé of Marshall, evoked the late chief justice's spirit by stating that "Mr. Chief Justice Marshall is not here to speak for himself" but that, if he had been, he would have ruled against the bank.

== Legacy ==
The decision in Briscoe demonstrated the Taney Court's divergence from the Marshall Court. It illustrated the Taney Court's embrace of Jacksonian principles of states' rights and opposition to national control of banking. The decision enabled states to take action to combat a depression that began in 1837, but it is of little significance today due to broad federal control of the financial system. Scholars have been divided in their views of the Briscoe ruling. In his 1957 book Banks and Politics in America, the financial historian Bray Hammond denounced the decision as "about as weak and timid as any the Court ever pronounced"; the legal historian James Willard Hurst characterized the majority opinion as an "unconvincing attempt" that was "devastated" by Story's dissent. By contrast, the legal scholar David P. Currie in 1985 described Briscoe as "a hard case in which the opposing opinions dealt intelligently with the competing considerations".
