= Taney Court =

Period of the US Supreme Court from 1836 to 1864

Supreme Court of the United States
Taney Court
- Marshall Court ← → Chase Court
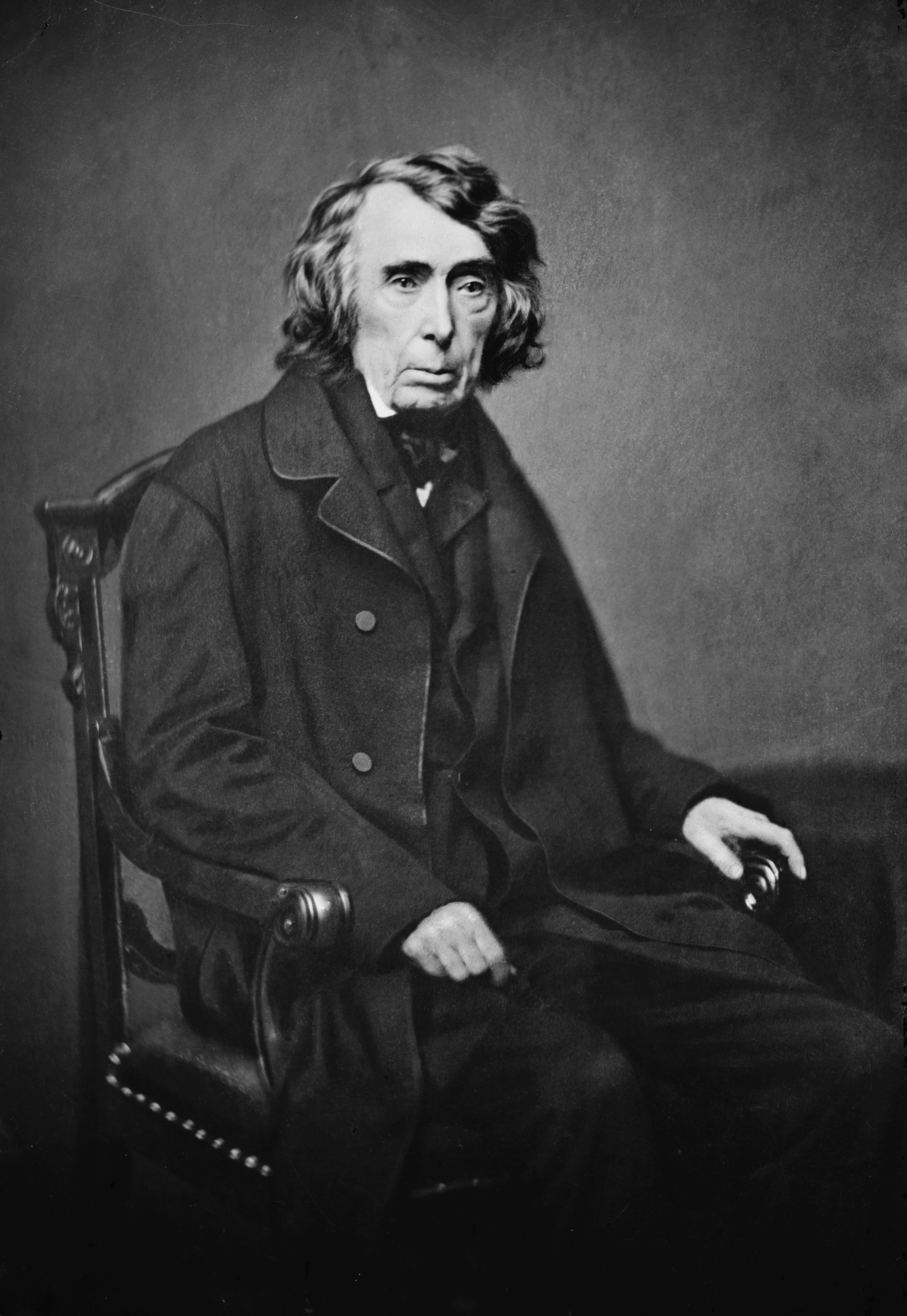
- Chief Justice Roger Taney
- March 28, 1836 – October 12, 1864 (28 years, 198 days)
- Seat: Old Supreme Court Chamber (1836–1860); Old Senate Chamber (1860–1864); Washington, D.C.
- No. of positions: 7 (1836–1837); 9 (1837–1863); 10 (1863–1864)
- Taney Court decisions

The Taney Court refers to the Supreme Court of the United States from 1836 to 1864, when Roger Taney served as the fifth Chief Justice of the United States. Taney succeeded John Marshall as Chief Justice after Marshall's death in 1835. Taney served as Chief Justice until his death in 1864, at which point Salmon P. Chase took office. Taney had been an important member of Andrew Jackson's administration, an advocate of Jacksonian democracy, and had played a major role in the Bank War, during which Taney wrote a memo questioning the Supreme Court's power of judicial review.

The Taney Court did not strongly break from the decisions and precedents of the Marshall Court, as it continued to uphold a strong federal government with an independent judiciary. Most of the Taney Court's holdings are overshadowed by the decision in Dred Scott v. Sandford, in which the court ruled that African-Americans could not be citizens. The Taney Court's decisions regarding economic issues and separation of powers set important precedents, and the Taney Court has been lauded for its ability to adapt regulatory law to a country undergoing remarkable technological and economic progress.

== Membership ==
Taney was appointed Chief Justice by President Andrew Jackson, who filled a vacancy caused by the death of Chief Justice John Marshall in 1835. Jackson had previously nominated Taney to fill a vacancy caused by the retirement of Gabriel Duvall, but Taney's appointment for that seat was not voted on by the Senate. Duvall's seat was instead filled by Philip P. Barbour in 1836. After the confirmation of Barbour, the Taney Court consisted of Taney, Barbour, and five Associate Justices from the Marshall Court: Joseph Story, Smith Thompson, John McLean, Henry Baldwin, and James Moore Wayne. Jackson appointed John Catron to the bench in 1837 after Congress increased the size of the Supreme Court to nine seats. The same year, President Martin Van Buren filled the other newly created seat with the appointment of John McKinley. Van Buren also appointed Peter Vivian Daniel in 1841 after the death of Barbour. Thompson died in 1843, but President John Tyler was unsuccessful in his attempts to fill the seat. However, Tyler was able to nominate Samuel Nelson right before leaving office, and soon after, President James K. Polk successfully nominated Levi Woodbury a short time after taking office, replacing Thompson and Story. Polk also appointed Robert Cooper Grier, replacing Baldwin; the vacancy caused by Baldwin's death is the longest in Supreme Court history.

Millard Fillmore appointed Benjamin Curtis to replace Woodbury in 1851; Curtis is the only Whig-appointed Justice in American history and is the last justice who was not appointed by a member of the Democratic or Republican parties. President Franklin Pierce appointed John Archibald Campbell in 1853, replacing McKinley. Curtis resigned from the court following the 1857 Dred Scott decision, and President James Buchanan appointed Nathan Clifford as his replacement. At the start of the Civil War, Campbell resigned from the court to serve as a Confederate official. McLean and Daniel also died around the same time. In 1862, President Abraham Lincoln appointed Noah Haynes Swayne (the first Republican-appointed justice in history), Samuel Freeman Miller, David Davis to replace them. Lincoln also appointed Stephen Johnson Field to a newly created seat. Taney died in 1864, and Lincoln appointed Salmon P. Chase as the new Chief Justice. The Taney Court is notable for its long vacancies, as the three longest vacancies in court history all occurred during Taney's tenure as Chief Justice.

=== Timeline ===
Note: + denotes new seat

Bar key:
Madison appointee Monroe appointee Jackson appointee Van Buren appointee Tyler appointee Polk appointee Fillmore appointee Pierce appointee Buchanan appointee Lincoln appointee

== Other branches ==
Presidents during this court included Andrew Jackson, Martin Van Buren, William Henry Harrison, John Tyler, James K. Polk, Zachary Taylor, Millard Fillmore, Franklin Pierce, James Buchanan, and Abraham Lincoln. Congresses during this court included 24th through the 38th United States Congresses.

== Rulings of the Court ==
The Taney Court issued several major rulings during its tenure, including:

- Charles River Bridge v. Warren Bridge (1837): In a decision delivered by Chief Justice Taney, the court upheld Massachusetts's granting of a charter to construct a bridge over the Charles River. The plaintiff, Charles River Bridge Company, owned another bridge on the river, and sued the state, arguing that Massachusetts was breaking a charter it had given the plaintiff in the 18th century. The court held that there was no violation of the Contract Clause, and also set an important precedent for a state's ability to promote the general welfare of its people.
- Luther v. Borden (1849): In a decision written by Chief Justice Taney, the court refused to intervene in the Dorr Rebellion. The plaintiffs alleged that Rhode Island's government violated the Guarantee Clause because it was not republican in nature. The court held that the case was a non-justiciable political question, and that it is Congress's role to determine whether a state's government qualifies as "republican."
- Cooley v. Board of Wardens (1852): In a decision delivered by Justice Curtis, the court upheld a Pennsylvania law requiring vessels leaving Philadelphia to use a local pilot or pay a fine. In the decision, the court set an important precedent regarding the Commerce Clause, charting a middle course between federal and state power. The decision gave states the ability to make some laws affecting interstate commerce, using a balancing test to determine whether state interests outweighed federal interests in uniform laws.
- Dred Scott v. Sandford (1857): In a 7–2 decision in which all nine justices wrote an opinion, Chief Justice Taney wrote the majority opinion. The court dismissed the plaintiff's suit, and held that the plaintiff remained a slave of the defendant. More importantly, the court also declared that no African-Americans (including free blacks) qualified as citizens of the United States, and that Congress did not have the power to ban slavery from the territories. The decision was strongly condemned by opponents of slavery, and was largely overturned by the Fourteenth Amendment.
- Ableman v. Booth (1859): In a unanimous decision written by Chief Justice Taney, the court held that federal courts have final say over issues of federal law, and thus state courts have no right to nullify federal court decisions regarding federal law.

For a full list of decisions by the Taney Court, see lists of United States Supreme Court cases by volume, volumes 36 through 68.

== See also ==
- Aboriginal title in the Taney Court
- Criminal law in the Taney Court
