= Poole v. Fleeger =

- Supreme Court of the United States

Decided February 11, 1837
- Full case name: Burgess Poole and Others, Plaintiffs in Error v. The Lessee of John Fleeger and Others
- Citations: 36 U.S. 185 (more) 11 Pet. 185; 9 L. Ed. 680; 1837 U.S. LEXIS 174

Holding
- Plaintiffs are granted title to land in Kentucky improperly conveyed by Tennessee prior to the Compact of 1820 establishing the two states' mutual border.

Court membership
- Chief Justice Roger B. Taney Associate Justices Joseph Story · Smith Thompson; John McLean · Henry Baldwin; James M. Wayne · Philip P. Barbour

Case opinion
- Majority: Story, joined by unanimous

Poole v. Fleeger, 36 U.S. (11 Pet.) 185 (1837), is a 7-to-0 ruling by the Supreme Court of the United States which held that the states of Kentucky and Tennessee had properly entered into an agreement establishing a mutual border between the two states. The plaintiffs in the case were granted title to property improperly conveyed by the state of Tennessee north of this border. In the ruling, the Supreme Court asserted the fundamental right of states and nations to establish their borders regardless of private contract, and made a fundamental statement about the rights of parties to object to a trial court ruling under the rules of civil procedure.

== Background ==
In 1606, during European colonization of the Americas, James I of England granted the Charter of 1606 to the newly established Virginia Company, asserting royal title to Native American-occupied land between the 34th and 45th latitudes and 100 miles (160 km) inland, and permitting the Virginia Company to establish colonies there. In 1609, James I redefined the Colony of Virginia's boundaries to extend the colony's northern and southern boundaries as well as asserting title to all land west to the Pacific Ocean. In 1632, Charles I of England took the Colony of Virginia's grant north of the Potomac River away from Virginia and gave it to the new colony known as the Province of Maryland. Subsequent negotiations between the Province of Pennsylvania colony and Colony of Virginia further established the Virginia colony's northwestern border.

In 1629, Charles I also granted Sir Robert Heath a charter giving him title to Native American-occupied land from the northern boundary of what is modern-day Florida north to Albemarle Sound (31st latitude), extending from the Atlantic Ocean west to the Pacific Ocean. In 1663, Charles II of England revoked the Heath charter and issued a new charter to eight English noblemen (the "Lords and Proprietors"). In 1665, this charter was amended to extend the land grant northward roughly to the current border between North Carolina and Virginia. In 1729, the Proprietors were forced to turn their charters over to George II of Great Britain, and North Carolina was separated from South Carolina.

Conflicting land claims as well as claims that land grants extended to the Pacific Ocean proved highly contentious issues after the American Revolution. To help resolve the issue, in 1781 Virginia agreed to surrender to the United States federal government all title to its land claims west of the Ohio River. Titled was transferred in 1784, and the United States Congress passed the Land Ordinance of 1784, Land Ordinance of 1785, and the Northwest Ordinance to turn these lands into territories and (eventually) states. North Carolina officials fought for six years over the issue of cession, but in 1790 agreed to transfer title of its western lands to the United States as well. Congress subsequently created the Southwest Territory (which encompassed the modern boundaries of the state of Tennessee) out of the ceded lands. In 1792, after 10 constitutional conventions and three statehood enabling acts passed by the Virginia legislature, Kentucky was admitted as a state on June 1, 1792. Tennessee was admitted as a state on June 1, 1796.

However, Kentucky's borders were only vaguely described at points, and determination of the final border still remained when Kentucky joined the union. In 1779–1780, Kentucky's southern border was surveyed and ascertained westward to the Tennessee River. The "Walker line" tended slightly to the north and did not run truly westward along 36 degrees, 30 minutes north (which was the actual border, also called the "Mathews line"). Complicating matters, in 1818 Andrew Jackson and Isaac Shelby purchased 2,000 square miles (5,200 km^{2}) from the Chickasaw Indian tribe. Known as the "Jackson Purchase," the purchase's southern border (with Tennessee) ran along the Mathews line. Although the Walker line was extended to the Ohio River (which formed the Purchase's western boundary), it was called the "Munsell line" (or "Alexander and Munsell line") on the western side of the Tennessee River and formed the new border with Tennessee. Kentucky and Tennessee agreed in the Compact of 1820 to accept the Mathews line to the Tennessee River, and from that point it should follow the Munsell line.

However, between 1786 and 1795, North Carolina had given title to much land in the disputed area to American Revolutionary War veterans in compensation for their services. Tennessee had also granted land in the area to military veterans between 1809 and 1814. In 1832, John Fleeger and others sued, seeking title to 2,727 acres (11.04 km^{2}) of land in Montgomery County, Tennessee which lay south of the Walker line and north of the Mathews line. Fleeger and the other plaintiffs were the heirs of Frederick Rohrer, whose will (registered in the state of Pennsylvania) they claimed gave them title to the land. Poole and the other defendants were the heirs of John Montgomery, a Virginia military veteran who had claimed the land after being given title to it by the state of Virginia in 1784.

A United States district court held that, under the Compact of 1820, Poole and the other plaintiffs were entitled to the land in question.

== Decision ==
Associate Justice Joseph Story delivered the unanimous opinion of the Court.

Story noted that Article 6 of the Compact of 1820 specifically protected land titles held by veterans and their heirs and assigns, while vacant land east of the Tennessee River and north of the Walker line would be the property of Kentucky and disposable by it. He then asserted in powerful language the right of the states of Kentucky and Tennessee to establish their borders as they wished:

It cannot be doubted that it is a part of the general right of sovereignty belonging to independent nations to establish and fix the disputed boundaries between their respective territories, and the boundaries so established and fixed by compact between nations become conclusive upon all the subjects and citizens thereof, and bind their rights and are to be treated, to all intents and purposes as the true and real boundaries. This is a doctrine universally recognized in the law and practice of nations.

Story therefore refused to upset the Compact of 1820.

The Compact of 1820 specifically upset any land titles granted by North Carolina or Tennessee north of latitude 36 degrees, 30 minutes north as improperly granted, Story affirmed. The defendants had argued that the Compact of 1820 violated the Contract Clause of the United States Constitution, which barred any state from passing "any Bill of Attainder, ex post facto Law, or Law impairing the Obligation of Contracts,..." But Story concluded that the Contract Clause did not apply here. The right of a state to set its borders was paramount (albeit subject to Congress' authority to admit states to the union), and the improper establishment of that boundary according to the Walker line created a defect in the contract which could not survive scrutiny.

Justice Story also addressed an issue of court procedure raised by the defendants. At trial, the defendants had argued that Rohrer's will had not been properly registered in Tennessee and thus did not govern the land title in Tennessee, and that the will had not been so registered until after the plaintiffs' suit had already begun. The trial court had overruled these objections. The plaintiffs had taken no exception to the trial court's ruling, and had not stated their right to reserve an exception. Did this create grounds for an appeal? Story concluded it did not. In a major statement about civil procedure, he wrote, "In the ordinary course of things at the trial, if an objection is made and overruled as to the admission of evidence and the party does not take any exception at the trial, he is understood to waive it." But even if the plaintiffs had managed to retain their right to object to the trial court's ruling, Story concluded, it did not matter when the will was registered in Tennessee. In a major statement on probate, Story concluded that if registration is correctly made, the time of the registration is immaterial.

The defendants at trial had also argued that the plaintiffs were attempting to seek title to the land through tenancy in common, but that a tenant in common cannot recover on a joint demise (which the plaintiffs were seeking). The trial court had overruled this objection, and once again the defendants had not taken exception to the trial court's ruling. Story reiterated his fundamental rule of civil procedure: "The party not taking any exception, and acquiescing in the intimation of the court, must be understood to waive the point as a matter of error and to insist upon it only as a matter for a new trial."

The judgment of the trial court was affirmed.

== Bibliography ==
- Ayers, Edward L.; Gould, Lewis L.; Oshinsky, David M.; and Soderland, Jean R. American Passages: A History of the United States. Boston, Mass.: Wadsworth/Cengage Learning, 2009.
- Bergeron, Paul H. Paths of Past: Tennessee, 1770–1970. Knoxville, Tenn.: University of Tennessee Press, 1979.
- Channing, Edward. A Students' History of the United States. New York: Macmillan Co., 1898.
- Chiorazzi, Michael and Most, Marguerite. Prestatehood Legal Materials: A Fifty-State Research Guide, Including New York City and the District of Columbia. Florence, Ky.: Routledge, 2006.
- Garrett, William Robertson. History of the South Carolina Cession, and the Northern Boundary of Tennessee. Nashville, Tenn.: Southern Methodist Publishing House, 1884.
- Harrison, Lowell Hayes. Kentucky's Road to Statehood. Lexington, Ky.: University Press of Kentucky, 1992.
- Harrison, Lowell Hayes and James C. Klotter A History of Kentucky. Lexington, Ky.: University Press of Kentucky, 1997.
- Hubbard, Bill. American Boundaries: The Nation, the States, the Rectangular Survey. Chicago: University of Chicago Press, 2009.
- Miller, Robert J. Native America, Discovered and Conquered: Thomas Jefferson, Lewis & Clark, and Manifest Destiny. Westport, Conn.: Praeger Publishers, 2006.
