= List of United States Supreme Court cases by the Taney Court =

Supreme Court of the United States
Taney Court
- Marshall Court ← → Chase Court
- March 28, 1836 – October 12, 1864 (28 years, 198 days)
- Seat: Old Supreme Court Chamber (1836–1860); Old Senate Chamber (1860–1864); Washington, D.C.
- No. of positions: 7 (1836–1837); 9 (1837–1863); 10 (1863–1864)
- Taney Court decisions

This is a partial chronological list of cases decided by the United States Supreme Court decided during the Taney Court, the tenure of Chief Justice Roger B. Taney from March 28, 1836 through October 12, 1864.

Case name	Citation	Summary
United States v. Segui	35 U.S. 306 (1836)	Upholding the validity of a Spanish land grant in Florida
Charles River Bridge v. Warren Bridge	36 U.S. 420 (1837)	Contract Clause of the Constitution
The Amistad	40 U.S. 518 (1841)	Slave trade and slave ownership
Swift v. Tyson	41 U.S. 1 (1842)	Federal common law in diversity jurisdiction cases, later overturned
Prigg v. Pennsylvania	41 U.S. 539 (1842)	Runaway slaves; Obligation of states to enforce Federal law
Luther v. Borden	48 U.S. 1 (1849)	Guarantee clause of Article Four of the United States Constitution
Passenger Cases	48 U.S. 283 (1849)	Taxation of immigrants, constitutionality of state laws regarding foreign commerce
Sheldon v. Sill	49 U.S. 441 (1850)	Congressional control of the jurisdiction of the lower federal courts
Hotchkiss v. Greenwood	52 U.S. 248 (1851)	Early standard for non-obviousness in United States patent law
Strader v. Graham	51 U.S. 82 (1851)	Slavery and the application of state laws thereof
Cooley v. Board of Wardens	53 U.S. 299 (1852)	Pilotage laws under the Commerce Clause
Dred Scott v. Sandford	60 U.S. 393 (1857)	Slavery, the definition of citizenship
Ableman v. Booth	62 U.S. 506 (1859)	The contradiction of Federal law by States
Prize Cases	67 U.S. 635 (1863)	Presidential powers in wartime
