= List of United States Supreme Court cases, volume 36 =

Supreme Court of the United States
- Interactive map of Supreme Court of the United States
- 38°53′26″N 77°00′16″W
- Established: March 4, 1789; 237 years ago
- Location: Washington, D.C.
- Coordinates: 38°53′26″N 77°00′16″W
- Composition method: Presidential nomination with Senate confirmation
- Authorised by: Constitution of the United States, Art. III, § 1
- Judge term length: life tenure, subject to impeachment and removal
- Number of positions: 9 (by statute)
- Website: supremecourt.gov

This is a list of cases reported in volume 36 (11 Pet.) of United States Reports, decided by the Supreme Court of the United States in 1837.

== Nominative reports ==
In 1874, the U.S. government created the United States Reports, and retroactively numbered older privately-published case reports as part of the new series. As a result, cases appearing in volumes 1–90 of U.S. Reports have dual citation forms; one for the volume number of U.S. Reports, and one for the volume number of the reports named for the relevant reporter of decisions (these are called "nominative reports").

=== Richard Peters, Jr. ===
Starting with the 26th volume of U.S. Reports, the Reporter of Decisions of the Supreme Court of the United States was Richard Peters, Jr. Peters was Reporter of Decisions from 1828 to 1843, covering volumes 26 through 41 of United States Reports which correspond to volumes 1 through 16 of his Peters's Reports. As such, the dual form of citation to, for example, Rhode Island v. Massachusetts is 36 U.S. (11 Pet.) 226 (1837).

== Justices of the Supreme Court at the time of 36 U.S. (11 Pet.) ==
The Supreme Court is established by Article III, Section 1 of the Constitution of the United States, which says: "The judicial Power of the United States, shall be vested in one supreme Court . . .". The size of the Court is not specified; the Constitution leaves it to Congress to set the number of justices. Under the Judiciary Act of 1789 Congress originally fixed the number of justices at six (one chief justice and five associate justices). Since 1789 Congress has varied the size of the Court from six to seven, nine, ten, and back to nine justices (always including one chief justice).

When the cases in 36 U.S. (11 Pet.) were decided, the Court comprised these seven justices:

Portrait	Justice	Office	Home State	Succeeded	Date confirmed by the Senate (Vote)	Tenure on Supreme Court
	Roger B. Taney	Chief Justice	Maryland	John Marshall	March 15, 1836 (29–15)	March 28, 1836 – October 12, 1864 (Died)
	Joseph Story	Associate Justice	Massachusetts	William Cushing	November 18, 1811 (Acclamation)	February 3, 1812 – September 10, 1845 (Died)
	Smith Thompson	Associate Justice	New York	Henry Brockholst Livingston	December 9, 1823 (Acclamation)	September 1, 1823 – December 18, 1843 (Died)
	John McLean	Associate Justice	Ohio	Robert Trimble	March 7, 1829 (Acclamation)	January 11, 1830 – April 4, 1861 (Died)
	Henry Baldwin	Associate Justice	Pennsylvania	Bushrod Washington	January 6, 1830 (41–2)	January 18, 1830 – April 21, 1844 (Died)
	James Moore Wayne	Associate Justice	Georgia	William Johnson	January 9, 1835 (Acclamation)	January 14, 1835 – July 5, 1867 (Died)
	Philip P. Barbour	Associate Justice	Virginia	Gabriel Duvall	March 15, 1836 (30–11)	May 12, 1836 – February 25, 1841 (Died)

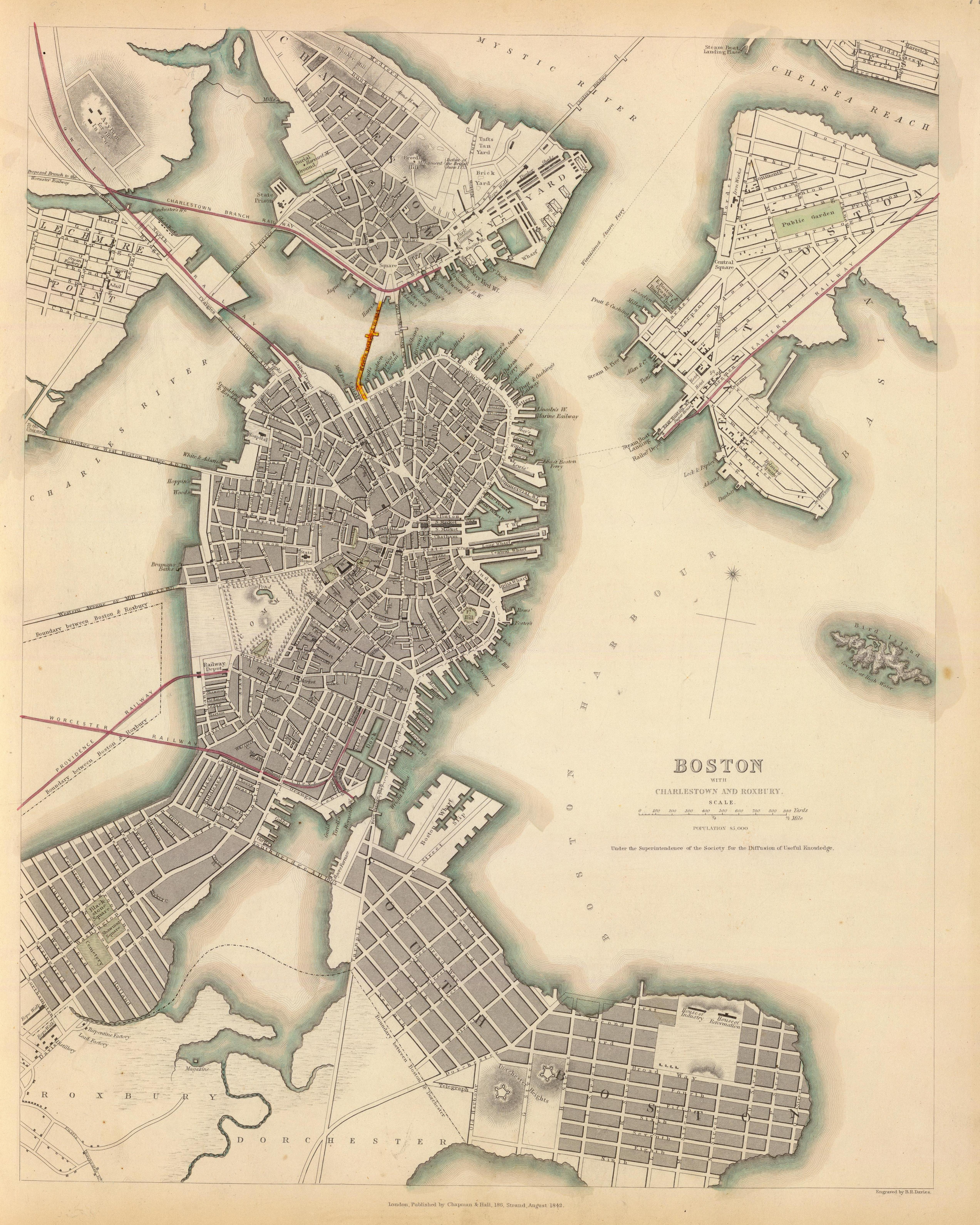
Warren Bridge (top center, highlighted) shown to the left of the Charles River Bridge

== Notable Cases in 36 U.S. (11 Pet.) ==
=== Charles River Bridge v. Warren Bridge ===
Charles River Bridge v. Warren Bridge, 36 U.S. (11 Pet.) 420 (1837), was a case regarding two financially-competing bridges, the Charles River Bridge and the Warren Bridge, of Boston, Massachusetts; it was heard by the Supreme Court early in the term of office of Chief Justice Roger B. Taney. In 1785, the Commonwealth of Massachusetts granted the Charles River Bridge Company a charter to construct a bridge over the Charles River connecting Boston and Charlestown. The charter did not expressly grant exclusive rights to the Charles River proprietors. In 1828 the Massachusetts legislature sanctioned another company to build the Warren Bridge, close to the first bridge and connecting the same cities. The owners of the Charles River Bridge claimed the Commonwealth had broken its contract with it, and so had violated the Contract Clause of the U.S. Constitution. The Supreme Court, however, found for the Warren Bridge, pointing out that with the progress of technology, canals and railroads had started to take away business from highways, and if corporate charters implied monopolies, then transportation improvements would not be able to flourish.

=== Poole v. Lessee of Fleeger ===
In Poole v. Lessee of Fleeger, 36 U.S. (11 Pet.) 185 (1837), the Supreme Court held that the states of Kentucky and Tennessee had properly entered into an agreement establishing a mutual border between the two states. The plaintiffs in the case were improperly granted title to property by Tennessee outside of its agreed border. In the ruling, the Supreme Court asserted the fundamental right of states and nations to establish their borders regardless of private contract.

== Citation style ==
Under the Judiciary Act of 1789 the federal court structure at the time comprised District Courts, which had general trial jurisdiction; Circuit Courts, which had mixed trial and appellate (from the US District Courts) jurisdiction; and the United States Supreme Court, which had appellate jurisdiction over the federal District and Circuit courts—and for certain issues over state courts. The Supreme Court also had limited original jurisdiction (i.e., in which cases could be filed directly with the Supreme Court without first having been heard by a lower federal or state court). There were one or more federal District Courts and/or Circuit Courts in each state, territory, or other geographical region.

Bluebook citation style is used for case names, citations, and jurisdictions.

- "C.C.D." = United States Circuit Court for the District of . . .
  - e.g.,"C.C.D.N.J." = United States Circuit Court for the District of New Jersey
- "D." = United States District Court for the District of . . .
  - e.g.,"D. Mass." = United States District Court for the District of Massachusetts
- "E." = Eastern; "M." = Middle; "N." = Northern; "S." = Southern; "W." = Western
  - e.g.,"C.C.S.D.N.Y." = United States Circuit Court for the Southern District of New York
  - e.g.,"M.D. Ala." = United States District Court for the Middle District of Alabama
- "Ct. Cl." = United States Court of Claims
- The abbreviation of a state's name alone indicates the highest appellate court in that state's judiciary at the time.
  - e.g.,"Pa." = Supreme Court of Pennsylvania
  - e.g.,"Me." = Supreme Judicial Court of Maine

== List of cases in 36 U.S. (11 Pet.) ==
Case Name	Page & year	Opinion of the Court	Concurring opinion(s)	Dissenting opinion(s)	Lower Court	Disposition
Marlatt's Lessee v. Silk	1 (1837)	Barbour	none	McLean	W.D. Pa.	reversed
McMicken v. Webb	25 (1837)	Thompson	none	none	E.D. La.	reversed
Ewing's Lessee v. Burnet	41 (1837)	Baldwin	none	none	C.C.D. Ohio	certification
Veazie v. Wadleigh	55 (1837)	Story	none	none	C.C.D. Me.	dismissal granted
Allen v. Hammond	63 (1837)	McLean	none	none	C.C.D.R.I.	affirmed
The Ship Garonne	73 (1837)	Taney	none	none	E.D. La.	affirmed
Evans v. Gee	80 (1837)	Wayne	none	none	S.D. Ala.	affirmed
United States v. Leffler	86 (1837)	Barbour	none	none	C.C.E.D. Va.	affirmed
City of New York v. Miln	102 (1837)	Barbour	none	Story	C.C.S.D.N.Y.	certification
United States v. Cox	162 (1837)	McLean	none	none	E.D. La.	dismissed
McBride v. Hoey's Lessee	167 (1837)	Taney	none	none	Pa.	dismissed
Postmaster General v. Trigg	173 (1837)	Taney	none	none	original	mandamus denied
The Steamboat Orleans	175 (1837)	Story	none	none	E.D. La.	dismissed
Poole v. Fleeger's Lessee	185 (1837)	Story	none	none	C.C.D.W. Tenn.	affirmed
Waters v. Merchants' Life Insurance Company	213 (1837)	Story	none	none	C.C.D. Ky.	certification
Rhode Island v. Massachusetts	226 (1837)	Taney	none	none	original	continued
Jackson v. Ashton	229 (1837)	McLean	none	none	C.C.D. Pa.	affirmed
Briscoe v. Bank of Kentucky	257 (1837)	McLean	Thompson	Story	Ky.	affirmed
Livingston v. Story	351 (1837)	Wayne	none	Baldwin	E.D. La.	reversed
Charles River Bridge v. Warren Bridge	420 (1837)	Taney	none	McLean; Story; Thompson	Mass.	affirmed

== See also ==
- Certificate of division
