= Circuit assignments in the Marshall Court =

Circuit riding was one of the responsibilities of U.S. Supreme Court justices during the Marshall Court (1801–1835). Under the Judiciary Act of 1801, the United States federal judicial districts were divided into six (and later seven) United States circuit courts—one for each justice. Rather than appointing separate circuit judges (with the exception of the brief interlude under the soon-repealed Midnight Judges Act), the circuit courts were staffed by a combination of the resident United States district court judges from that district and the Supreme Court justice assigned to that circuit (either could preside alone or they could preside together).

While the circuits were the unit of circuit riding assignments, the individual circuit courts were referred to by the name of the judicial district (e.g. "United States Circuit Court for the District of New Hampshire," or, in case citations, C.C.D.N.H.).

Some districts were not within any circuit (for example, under the Judiciary Act of 1801: Maine, Kentucky, and Tennessee). These district courts exercised the powers of circuit courts, and appeals from the district court were possible only to the Supreme Court. Circuit riding did not occur within such districts.

== History of the circuit courts ==
- Judiciary Act of 1802, 2 Stat. 156
  - First circuit: New Hampshire, Massachusetts, and Rhode Island
  - Second circuit: Connecticut, New York, and Vermont
  - Third circuit: New Jersey and Pennsylvania
  - Fourth circuit: Maryland and Delaware
  - Fifth circuit: Virginia and North Carolina
  - Sixth circuit: South Carolina and Georgia
- Act of Feb. 24, 1807, 2 Stat. 420
  - Seventh circuit created, consisting of the (pre-existing) Districts of Kentucky, Eastern Tennessee, Western Tennessee, and Ohio; one justice added to Supreme Court
- Act of Apr. 9, 1814, 3 Stat. 120
  - District of New York divided into Northern and Southern Districts; circuit court held only in the Southern District; Northern District given the power of a circuit court
- Act of Apr. 20, 1818, 3 Stat. 462
  - District of Pennsylvania divided into Eastern and Western Districts; circuit court held in both; Western District given power of a circuit court
- Act of Feb. 4, 1819, 3 Stat. 478
  - District of Virginia divided into Eastern and Western Districts; each given the power of a circuit court
- Act of Mar. 30, 1820, 3 Stat. 554
  - District of Maine added to the first circuit

== History of the assignments ==
Period	First circuit	Second circuit	Third circuit	Fourth circuit	Fifth circuit	Sixth circuit	Seventh circuit
1802–1804	Cushing	Paterson	Washington	Chase	Marshall	Moore	N/A
1804–1806	Cushing	Paterson	Washington	Chase	Marshall	Johnson	N/A
1807–1810	Cushing	Livingston	Washington	Chase	Marshall	Johnson	Todd
1810–1811	Vacant	Livingston	Washington	Chase	Marshall	Johnson	Todd
1811–1812	Story	Livingston	Washington	Duvall	Marshall	Johnson	Todd
1812–1823	Story	Livingston	Washington	Duvall	Marshall	Johnson	Todd
1823–1826	Story	Thompson	Washington	Duvall	Marshall	Johnson	Todd
1826–1828	Story	Thompson	Washington	Duvall	Marshall	Johnson	Trimble
1828–1829	Story	Thompson	Washington	Duvall	Marshall	Johnson	McLean
1830–1834	Story	Thompson	Baldwin	Duvall	Marshall	Johnson	McLean
1835	Story	Thompson	Baldwin	Duvall	Marshall	Wayne	McLean
