= List of United States Supreme Court justices by time in office =

Longest Supreme Court tenure
Chief justice	Associate justice
John Marshall 12,570 days (1801–1835)	William O. Douglas 13,358 days (1939–1975)

A total of 116 people have served on the Supreme Court of the United States, the highest judicial body in the United States, since it was established in 1789. Supreme Court justices have life tenure, meaning that they serve until they die, resign, retire, or are impeached and removed from office. For the 107 non-incumbent justices, the average length of service was 6,203 days (16 years, 359 days). (Note: Average tenure in office has increased significantly over the past half-century. In 1970, the average tenure in office (for the 89 justices who had left the Court prior to 1970) was about fifteen years.) The longest serving justice was William O. Douglas, with a tenure of 13,358 days (36 years, 209 days). The longest serving chief justice was John Marshall, with a tenure of 12,570 days (34 years, 152 days). John Rutledge, who served on the court twice, was both the shortest serving associate justice, with a tenure of 383 days (1 year, 18 days), and the shortest serving chief justice, with a tenure of 138 days (4 months 16 days). Among the current members of the court, Clarence Thomas' tenure of 12,811 days (35 years, 27 days) (Note: As of November 19, 2026) is the longest, while Ketanji Brown Jackson's 1,603 days (4 years, 142 days) is the shortest.

The table below ranks all United States Supreme Court justices by time in office. (Note: A nominee who was confirmed by the United States Senate but declined to serve, such as Robert H. Harrison, or who died after being confirmed but before taking the necessary steps toward becoming a member of the court, such as Edwin Stanton, is not considered to have served as a justice, and thus not included on this list.) For five individuals confirmed for associate justice, and who later served as chief justice—Charles Evans Hughes, William Rehnquist, John Rutledge, Harlan F. Stone, and Edward Douglass White—their cumulative length of service on the court is measured. The basis of the ranking is the difference between dates; if counted by number of calendar days all the figures would be one greater, with the exception of Charles Evans Hughes and John Rutledge, who would receive two days, as each served on the court twice (their service as associate justice and as chief justice was separated by a period of years off the court). The start date given for each justice is the day they took the prescribed oath of office, with the end date being the date of the justice's death, resignation, or retirement. A highlighted row indicates a justice currently serving on the court.

== Justices by time in office ==
Rank	Name	Duration in days	Duration in years and days	Start	End
1	William O. Douglas	13,358	36 years, 209 days	April 17, 1939	November 12, 1975
2	Clarence Thomas	12,811	35 years, 27 days	October 23, 1991	Incumbent
3	Stephen Johnson Field	12,614	34 years, 195 days	May 20, 1863	December 1, 1897
4	John Paul Stevens	12,611	34 years, 192 days	December 19, 1975	June 29, 2010
5	John Marshall (CJ)	12,570	34 years, 152 days	February 4, 1801	July 6, 1835
6	Hugo Black	12,447	34 years, 29 days	August 19, 1937	September 17, 1971
7	John Marshall Harlan	12,360	33 years, 308 days	December 10, 1877	October 14, 1911
8	William J. Brennan Jr.	12,330	33 years, 277 days	October 16, 1956	July 20, 1990
9	William Rehnquist (CJ)	12,293 (Note: Length of tenure includes 5,376 days' service as associate justice and 6,917 days as chief justice.)	33 years, 239 days	January 7, 1972	September 26, 1986
9	William Rehnquist (CJ)	12,293	33 years, 239 days	September 26, 1986	September 3, 2005
10	Joseph Story	12,273	33 years, 219 days	February 3, 1812	September 10, 1845
11	James M. Wayne	11,860	32 years, 172 days	January 14, 1835	July 5, 1867
12	John McLean	11,711	32 years, 23 days	March 12, 1829	April 4, 1861
13	Byron White	11,396	31 years, 73 days	April 16, 1962	June 28, 1993
14	Bushrod Washington	11,339	31 years, 17 days	November 9, 1798	November 26, 1829
15	Anthony Kennedy	11,121	30 years, 163 days	February 18, 1988	July 31, 2018
16	William Johnson	11,046	30 years, 89 days	May 7, 1804	August 4, 1834
17	Antonin Scalia	10,732	29 years, 140 days	September 26, 1986	February 13, 2016
18	Oliver Wendell Holmes	10,627	29 years, 35 days	December 8, 1902	January 12, 1932
19	Roger B. Taney (CJ)	10,425	28 years, 198 days	March 28, 1836	October 12, 1864
20	Samuel Freeman Miller	10,311	28 years, 84 days	July 21, 1862	October 13, 1890
21	John Catron	10,256	28 years, 29 days	May 1, 1837	May 30, 1865
22	Stephen Breyer	10,193	27 years, 331 days	August 3, 1994	June 30, 2022
23	Samuel Nelson	10,136	27 years, 275 days	February 27, 1845	November 28, 1872
24	Edward Douglass White (CJ)	9,929 (Note: Length of tenure includes 6,125 days' service as associate justice and 3,804 days as chief justice.)	27 years, 68 days	March 12, 1894	December 19, 1910
24	Edward Douglass White (CJ)	9,929	27 years, 68 days	December 19, 1910	May 19, 1921
25	Ruth Bader Ginsburg	9,901	27 years, 39 days	August 10, 1993	September 18, 2020
26	Joseph McKenna	9,840	26 years, 345 days	January 26, 1898	January 5, 1925
27	Willis Van Devanter	9,647	26 years, 150 days	January 3, 1911	June 2, 1937
28	James Clark McReynolds	9,608	26 years, 111 days	October 12, 1914	January 31, 1941
29	Sandra Day O'Connor	8,894	24 years, 128 days	September 25, 1981	January 31, 2006
30	Harry Blackmun	8,821	24 years, 55 days	June 9, 1970	August 3, 1994
31	Thurgood Marshall	8,765	23 years, 364 days	October 2, 1967	October 1, 1991
32	Felix Frankfurter	8,611	23 years, 210 days	January 30, 1939	August 28, 1962
33	Nathan Clifford	8,586	23 years, 185 days	January 21, 1858	July 25, 1881
34	Robert Cooper Grier	8,575	23 years, 174 days	August 10, 1846	January 31, 1870
35	Gabriel Duvall	8,453	23 years, 52 days	November 23, 1811	January 14, 1835
36	Potter Stewart	8,298	22 years, 262 days	October 14, 1958	July 3, 1981
37	Louis Brandeis	8,288	22 years, 253 days	June 5, 1916	February 13, 1939
38	Joseph P. Bradley	7,975	21 years, 305 days	March 23, 1870	January 22, 1892
39	Melville Fuller (CJ)	7,938	21 years, 269 days	October 8, 1888	July 4, 1910
40	John Roberts (CJ)	7,721	21 years, 51 days	September 29, 2005	Incumbent
41	Harlan F. Stone (CJ)	7,721 (Note: Length of tenure includes 5,966 days' service as associate justice and 1,754 days as chief justice.)	21 years, 51 days	March 2, 1925	July 2, 1941
41	Harlan F. Stone (CJ)	7,721	21 years, 51 days	July 3, 1941	April 22, 1946
42	Samuel Alito	7,597	20 years, 292 days	January 31, 2006	Incumbent
43	Horace Gray	7,553	20 years, 249 days	January 9, 1882	September 15, 1902
44	William Cushing	7,527	20 years, 223 days	February 2, 1790	September 13, 1810
45	Smith Thompson	7,413	20 years, 108 days	September 1, 1823	December 18, 1843
46	David J. Brewer	7,385	20 years, 81 days	January 6, 1890	March 28, 1910
47	William R. Day	7,196	19 years, 256 days	March 2, 1903	November 13, 1922
48	Stanley Forman Reed	6,965	19 years, 25 days	January 31, 1938	February 25, 1957
49	Noah Haynes Swayne	6,937	18 years, 363 days	January 27, 1862	January 24, 1881
50	Thomas Todd	6,854	18 years, 279 days	May 4, 1807	February 7, 1826
51	David Souter	6,838	18 years, 263 days	October 9, 1990	June 29, 2009
52	Peter V. Daniel	6,716	18 years, 142 days	January 10, 1842	May 31, 1860
53	Tom C. Clark	6,501	17 years, 292 days	August 24, 1949	June 12, 1967
54	Sonia Sotomayor	6,312	17 years, 103 days	August 8, 2009	Incumbent
55	Warren E. Burger (CJ)	6,304	17 years, 95 days	June 23, 1969	September 26, 1986
56	Charles Evans Hughes (CJ)	6,214 (Note: Length of tenure includes 2,070 days' service as associate justice and 4,144 days as chief justice.)	17 years, 5 days	October 10, 1910	June 10, 1916
56	Charles Evans Hughes (CJ)	6,214	17 years, 5 days	February 24, 1930	June 30, 1941
57	Pierce Butler	6,162	16 years, 318 days	January 2, 1923	November 16, 1939
58	John Marshall Harlan II	6,023	16 years, 179 days	March 28, 1955	September 23, 1971
59	Elena Kagan	5,948	16 years, 104 days	August 7, 2010	Incumbent
60	Henry Brockholst Livingston	5,901	16 years, 57 days	January 20, 1807	March 18, 1823
61	Earl Warren (CJ)	5,740	15 years, 261 days	October 5, 1953	June 23, 1969
62	Lewis Franklin Powell	5,649	15 years, 170 days	January 7, 1972	June 26, 1987
63	Henry Billings Brown	5,621	15 years, 143 days	January 5, 1891	May 28, 1906
64	Samuel Chase	5,613	15 years, 135 days	February 4, 1796	June 19, 1811
65	George Sutherland	5,586	15 years, 107 days	October 2, 1922	January 17, 1938
66	Owen Roberts	5,538	15 years, 59 days	June 2, 1930	July 31, 1945
67	John McKinley	5,305	14 years, 192 days	January 9, 1838	July 19, 1852
68	Henry Baldwin	5,207	14 years, 94 days	January 18, 1830	April 21, 1844
69	David Davis	5,198	14 years, 84 days	December 10, 1862	March 4, 1877
70	Morrison Waite (CJ)	5,133	14 years, 19 days	March 4, 1874	March 23, 1888
71	Rufus W. Peckham	5,039	13 years, 291 days	January 6, 1896	October 24, 1909
72	William Paterson	4,929	13 years, 182 days	March 11, 1793	September 9, 1806
73	Robert H. Jackson	4,838	13 years, 90 days	July 11, 1941	October 9, 1954
74	Harold H. Burton	4,760	13 years, 12 days	October 1, 1945	October 13, 1958
75	Samuel Blatchford	4,113	11 years, 95 days	April 3, 1882	July 7, 1893
76	Mahlon Pitney	3,940	10 years, 288 days	March 18, 1912	December 31, 1922
77	William Strong	3,928	10 years, 275 days	March 14, 1870	December 14, 1880
78	George Shiras Jr.	3,787	10 years, 136 days	October 10, 1892	February 23, 1903
79	Neil Gorsuch	3,510	9 years, 223 days	April 10, 2017	Incumbent
80	Frank Murphy	3,452	9 years, 164 days	February 5, 1940	July 19, 1949
81	James Iredell	3,448	9 years, 161 days	May 12, 1790	October 20, 1799
82	Ward Hunt	3,305	9 years, 18 days	January 9, 1873	January 27, 1882
83	James Wilson	3,242	8 years, 320 days	October 5, 1789	August 21, 1798
84	William Howard Taft (CJ)	3,129	8 years, 207 days	July 11, 1921	February 3, 1930
85	Salmon P. Chase (CJ)	3,065	8 years, 143 days	December 15, 1864	May 7, 1873
86	Brett Kavanaugh	2,966	8 years, 44 days	October 6, 2018	Incumbent
87	John Archibald Campbell	2,941	8 years, 19 days	April 11, 1853	April 30, 1861
88	Stanley Matthews	2,866	7 years, 309 days	May 17, 1881	March 22, 1889
89	Fred M. Vinson (CJ)	2,633	7 years, 76 days	June 24, 1946	September 8, 1953
90	Edward Terry Sanford	2,574	7 years, 17 days	February 19, 1923	March 8, 1930
91	Sherman Minton	2,560	7 years, 3 days	October 12, 1949	October 15, 1956
92	Wiley Rutledge	2,399	6 years, 207 days	February 15, 1943	September 10, 1949
93	William Burnham Woods	2,320	6 years, 129 days	January 5, 1881	May 14, 1887
94	Benjamin N. Cardozo	2,308	6 years, 117 days	March 14, 1932	July 9, 1938
95	Amy Coney Barrett	2,214	6 years, 23 days	October 27, 2020	Incumbent
96	Benjamin Robbins Curtis	2,182	5 years, 355 days	October 10, 1851	September 30, 1857
97	Levi Woodbury	2,172	5 years, 346 days	September 23, 1845	September 4, 1851
98	John Hessin Clarke	2,170	5 years, 344 days	October 9, 1916	September 18, 1922
99	John Blair	2,091	5 years, 265 days	February 2, 1790	October 25, 1795
100	John Jay (CJ)	2,079	5 years, 253 days	October 19, 1789	June 29, 1795
101 (tie)	Lucius Quintus Cincinnatus Lamar	1,832	5 years, 5 days	January 18, 1888	January 23, 1893
101 (tie)	Charles Evans Whittaker	1,832	5 years, 6 days	March 25, 1957	March 31, 1962
103	Joseph Rucker Lamar	1,825	4 years, 364 days	January 3, 1911	January 2, 1916
104	Philip P. Barbour	1,750	4 years, 289 days	May 12, 1836	February 25, 1841
105	Oliver Ellsworth (CJ)	1,742	4 years, 282 days	March 8, 1796	December 15, 1800
106	Horace Harmon Lurton	1,651	4 years, 190 days	January 3, 1910	July 12, 1914
107	Ketanji Brown Jackson	1,603	4 years, 142 days	June 30, 2022	Incumbent
108	William Henry Moody	1,434	3 years, 338 days	December 17, 1906	November 20, 1910
109	Alfred Moore	1,375	3 years, 280 days	April 21, 1800	January 26, 1804
110	Abe Fortas	1,318	3 years, 222 days	October 4, 1965	May 14, 1969
111	Arthur Goldberg	1,028	2 years, 297 days	October 1, 1962	July 25, 1965
112	Howell E. Jackson	887	2 years, 157 days	March 4, 1893	August 8, 1895
113	Robert Trimble	801	2 years, 70 days	June 16, 1826	August 25, 1828
114	John Rutledge (CJ)	521 (Note: Length of tenure includes 383 days service as associate justice and 138 days as chief justice.)	1 year, 156 days	February 15, 1790; August 12, 1795	March 5, 1791; December 28, 1795
115	Thomas Johnson	485	1 year, 119 days	September 19, 1791	January 16, 1793
116	James F. Byrnes	452	1 year, 87 days	July 8, 1941	October 3, 1942

== See also ==
- List of United States federal judges by longevity of service
