= Robert Taylor (Virginia politician) =

American politician

Robert Taylor (April 29, 1763 – July 3, 1845) was a nineteenth-century politician and lawyer from Virginia, serving one term in the U.S. House of Representatives from 1825 to 1827.

== Biography ==
Born in Orange Court House, Virginia, Taylor completed preparatory studies, studied law and was admitted to the bar 1783, commencing practice in Orange Court House.

He held several local offices before serving in the Virginia Senate from 1804 to 1815 also serving as president pro tempore from 1812 to 1814.

=== Congress ===
In 1824, Taylor was elected an Adams Republican to the United States House of Representatives, serving from 1825 to 1827. He was not running a candidate for reelection.

=== Later career ===
Afterwards, Taylor devoted his attention to the management of his plantation and his legal practice. Taylor drafted the will of former President James Madison (a relative), whom he persuaded not to emancipate slaves, but leave instructions and allow Dolley Madison to do so in her will (which she failed to do).

=== Death and burial ===
Taylor died at his estate called "Meadow Farm" in Orange County, Virginia, on July 3, 1845, and was interred in the family cemetery on the estate.

=== Personal life ===
He had married Frances Pendleton (1767–1831). Their grandson, James Taliaferro, became U.S. senator from Florida. President Zachary Taylor was another relative (having the same grandfather, who is also buried in the former Meadow Farm estate cemetery).

U.S. House of Representatives
Preceded by Philip P. Barbour	Member of the U.S. House of Representatives from Virginia's 11th congressional district March 4, 1825 – March 3, 1827	Succeeded by Philip P. Barbour
