= Warren Bridge =

Bridge in Boston, Massachusetts, US

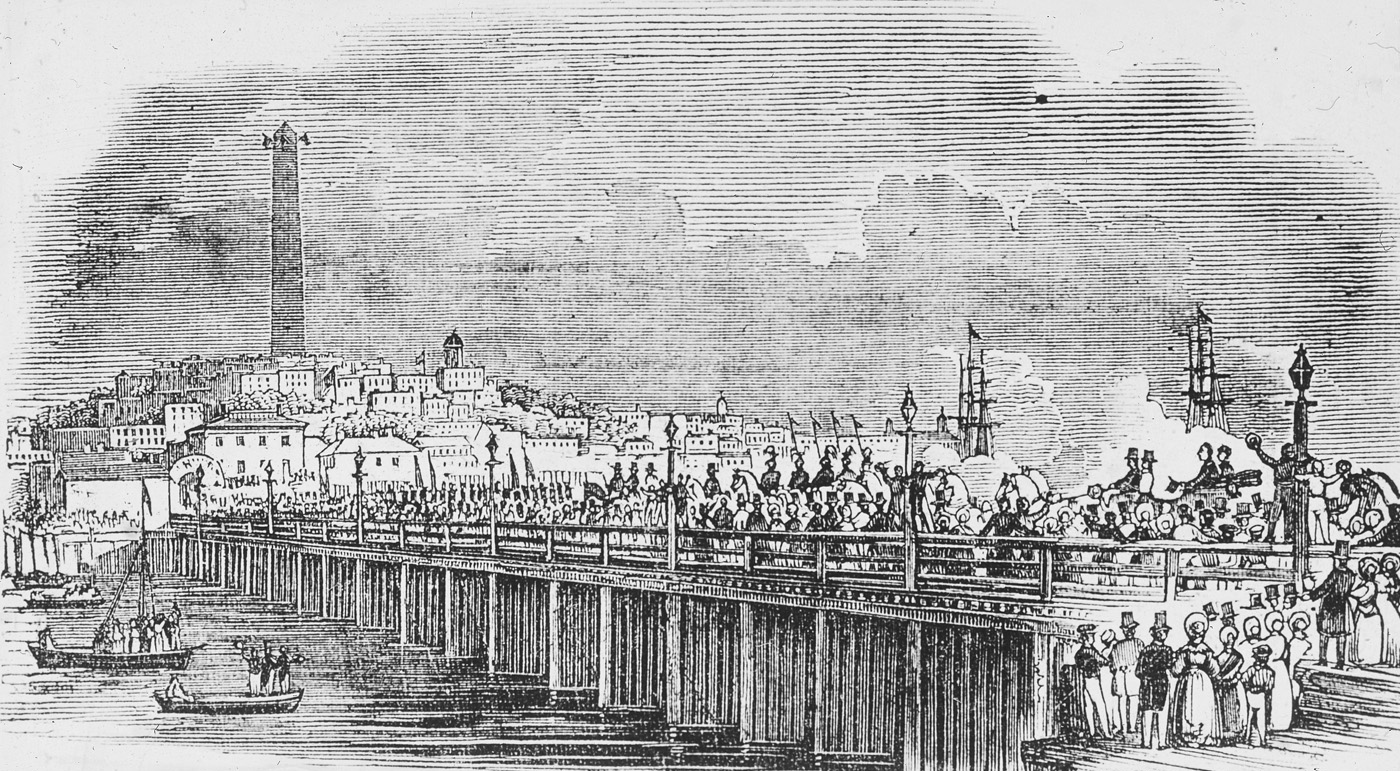
- Procession crossing Warren Bridge, depicted in 1843
- Coordinates: 42°22′8″N 71°3′42″W
- Crosses: Charles River

History
- Opened: December 25, 1828
- Closed: 1962
- Replaced by: Charles River Dam

The Warren Bridge connected downtown Boston, Massachusetts with Charlestown from its construction in the 1820s until its demolition in 1962. It was replaced by the Charles River Dam in 1978.

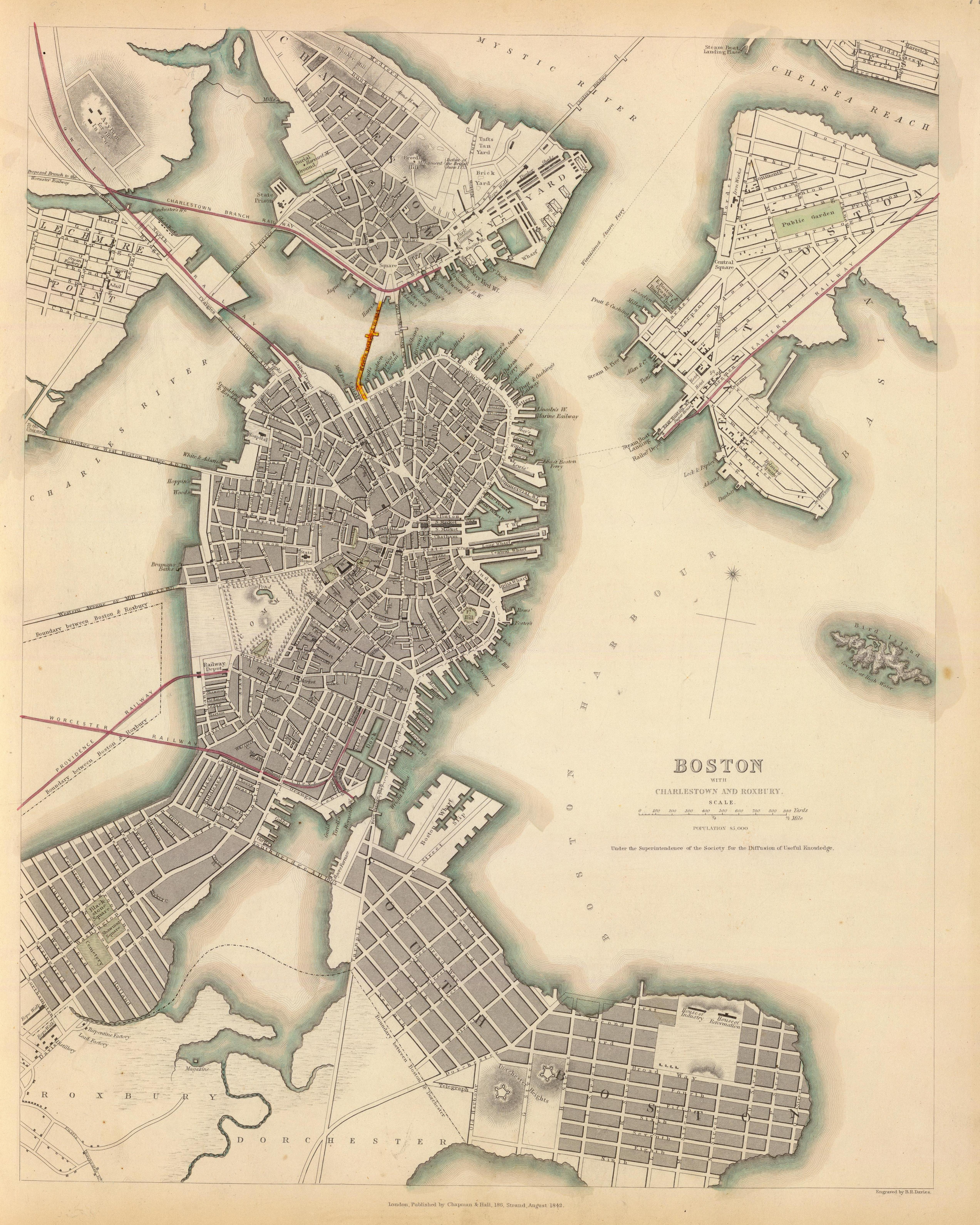
Warren Bridge (highlighted in red), 1842

The Warren Bridge was requested in 1823 and chartered in 1828 by John Skinner and Isaac Warren, in response to the politically unpopular tolls on the 1786 Charles River Bridge. Its proprietors were authorized to collect tolls until they were reimbursed the cost of building the bridge and the other necessary expenses, with five per cent interest thereon, when the bridge was to revert to the Commonwealth. They were expressly limited from taking tolls for a longer period than six years.

The bridge opened for travel on December 25, 1828. It connected Beverly Street in the North End of Boston to the then-independent city of Charlestown at City Square. The Charles River Bridge also terminated at City Square, with the Boston side at Charlestown Street (now North Washington Street, the site of the current Charlestown Bridge). This prompted a lawsuit, in which Daniel Webster served as attorney for the Charles River Bridge proprietors, which eventually reached the United States Supreme Court as Charles River Bridge v. Warren Bridge.

The Commonwealth in 1833, assumed the control of the bridge, and tolls were received to its use until April, 1836, when the bridge was declared free. The Warren Bridge devolved to a state-owned, toll-free bridge on March 2, 1836. The receipts from tolls charged by the State on the Charles River Bridge and Warren Bridge, were sufficient to establish a fund of $850,000; and on the 1st December, 1843, the bridges were declared free, and so remained until June 1, 1854, when the income of the fund being found insufficient to sustain the bridges, and a large portion of the principal having been expended, tolls were again imposed on both bridges, to continue until a sufficient sum should be received to rebuild the Charles River Bridge, and repair the Warren Bridge, and to leave in the treasury of the Commonwealth a fund of $100,000 for the future maintenance and repair of the bridges. This was accomplished in 1858, and since April 30, 1858, both bridges were free.

== Sources ==
- Ordinances and rules and orders of the city of Boston: together with the general and special statutes of the Massachusetts legislature relating to the city, Alfreid Mudge & Son, printers, Boston, 1869, pages 71–73.
