= Charles River Bridge v. Warren Bridge =

Coordinates: 42.3688°N 71.06042°W

- Supreme Court of the United States

Argued January 19, 1837 Decided February 14, 1837
- Full case name: The Proprietors of Charles River Bridge, Plaintiffs in Error v. The Proprietors of Warren Bridge, and others
- Citations: 36 U.S. 420 (more) 11 Pet. 420; 9 L. Ed. 773

Case history
- Prior: None
- Subsequent: None

Holding
- That the Massachusetts state legislature's decision to grant a charter to the proprietors of Warren Bridge after granting a similar charter to the Charles River Bridge Company did not constitute a violation of the Contract Clause.

Court membership
- Chief Justice Roger B. Taney Associate Justices Joseph Story · Smith Thompson; John McLean · Henry Baldwin; James M. Wayne · Philip P. Barbour

Case opinions
- Majority: Taney
- Concurrence: McLean, joined by Barbour, Baldwin, Wayne
- Dissent: Story, joined by Thompson

Laws applied
- Article One of the United States Constitution

Charles River Bridge v. Warren Bridge, 36 U.S. (11 Pet.) 420 (1837), was a case regarding the Charles River Bridge and the Warren Bridge of Boston, Massachusetts, heard by the United States Supreme Court under the leadership of Chief Justice Roger B. Taney.

In 1785, the Charles River Bridge Company was granted a charter to construct a bridge over the Charles River connecting Boston and Charlestown, roughly where the present-day Charlestown Bridge is located. When the Commonwealth of Massachusetts sanctioned another company to build the Warren Bridge in 1828, that would be very close in proximity to the first bridge and would connect the same two cities, the proprietors of the Charles River Bridge claimed that the Massachusetts legislature had broken its contract with the Charles River Bridge Company, and thus the contract clause had been violated. The owners of the first bridge claimed that the charter had implied exclusive rights to the Charles River Bridge Company. The Court ultimately sided with Warren Bridge. This decision was received with mixed opinions, and had some impact on the remainder of Taney's tenure as Chief Justice.

== Charles River Bridge ==
In 1640 the legislature of the Massachusetts Bay Colony, in accordance with common law, assumed control over public ferries. The legislature proceeded to give Harvard College permission to run a ferry on the Charles River between Boston and Charlestown. Harvard operated the ferry until 1785. That year, a group of men petitioned the state legislature to build a bridge across the river due to the inconvenience of the ferry. As time had passed, the two towns had grown and communication between them had become more important, and technology was at a point now where a bridge appeared to be a wise economic undertaking.

The request was granted and the Charles River Bridge Company was given permission to build a bridge and collect tolls for 40 years, but during those 40 years the company would have to pay 200 pounds (or ~$670) to Harvard College annually in order to make up for the profits the college would lose from the ferry. After 40 years of collecting tolls, the company would turn the bridge over to the state, but the government would still have to make the annual payment. In 1792, the Massachusetts legislature extended this charter to seventy years from the opening of the bridge.

== Warren Bridge ==
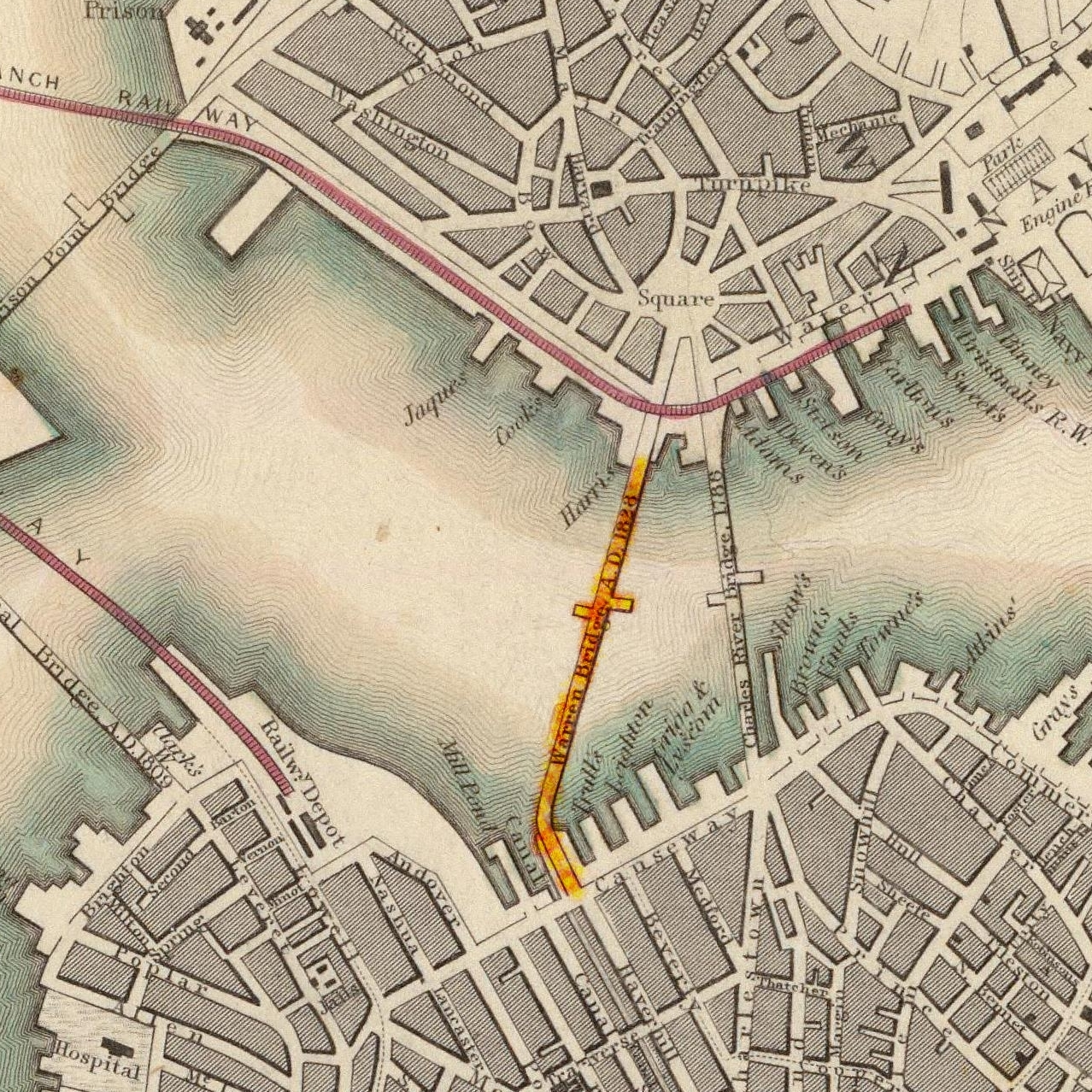
Warren Bridge (highlighted) and its competitor (1838)

As time passed, the population of Boston increased, as did the amount of business the city was doing with the rest of the world. With these increases, the Charles River Bridge collected more and more profits, and the value of the company's stock started to rise. Shares that had a par value of $333.33 sold for $1,650 in 1805, and by 1814, their price had risen to $2,080. By 1823, the value of the company was estimated to be $280,000, a substantial increase from its original value of $50,000. Between 1786 and 1827 the Charles River Bridge had collected $824,798 in tolls. Very few of the shares belonged to the company's original investors at this time, and the stock was now owned by men who had bought it at very high prices. The public started to complain about having to continue to pay tolls after the bridge's profits had far surpassed the original capital, with interest; but the new investors did not care. In their opinion, they had paid a large sum for the bridge stock, and they did not wish to stop collecting tolls until they themselves had turned a profit. These proprietors decided not to meet any of the public's demands, and they refused both to improve services and reduce tolls.

There were multiple attempts to convince the state legislature to give permission to build a new bridge between Boston and Charlestown, which would be in direct competition with the Charles River Bridge. Eventually, the legislature agreed to grant a charter for a new bridge between Charlestown and Boston. In 1828, a company was given the rights to build the Warren Bridge, 275 yards from the first one. The Warren Bridge would be turned over to the state once enough tolls had been collected to pay for the bridge's construction, or after a maximum of 6 years, after which it would be free to the public. Since it was free, and so close to the Charles River Bridge, the Warren Bridge would obviously take all of the competing bridge's traffic, and therefore its construction would leave the stock of the Charles River Bridge highly devalued and the shareholders would stand to lose a great deal of money. The owners of the Charles River Bridge appealed to the legislature, which responded by giving them another 30 years to collect tolls, extending the collection period to 100 years.

== Arguing the case ==
After the Warren Bridge charter was granted, the Charles River Bridge Company filed a lawsuit in the Massachusetts Supreme Judicial Court (SJC) in an effort to stop the construction of the second bridge. The SJC was divided 2–2 on the matter, and the case was appealed to the United States Supreme Court. The case was argued before the Court in 1831, where the plaintiffs argued that it was unconstitutional for the Massachusetts legislature to charter the Warren Bridge, because creating a competing bridge violated the contract clause in Article I, Section 10, which states, "No State shall pass any Bill of Attainder, ex post facto Law, or Law impairing the Obligation of Contracts".

It appears as though Chief Justice John Marshall, Justice Joseph Story and Justice Smith Thompson, were all in agreement that the Massachusetts legislature had indeed violated the obligation of contract clause in the constitution, but because of justice absences, and disagreements between the justices, no final decision was reached, and the case languished for six years. During that time, three new justices were appointed by President Andrew Jackson, including the new Chief Justice, Roger Taney; the Warren Bridge had been constructed, and made back the money it had cost to build, and had become a toll-free bridge. The Charles River Bridge was now closed, since it was no longer getting any traffic due to its toll.

Before the Charles River Bridge case was argued before the Supreme Court again, there was a situation in 1833 involving the Camden and Amboy Railroad and the Delaware and Raritan Canal companies. This was not a case that went before the Supreme Court, but many prominent lawyers and justices were asked for their opinion on the situation, and among them was Taney, who was then the Attorney General of the United States. Both of the companies had convinced the New Jersey legislature of 1832 to add a condition to their charters that no other companies would be able to build a means of transportation between Philadelphia and New York City for a certain amount of time. Taney's opinion on the case was that no legislature should have the power to stop the state from creating internal improvements because it was such an important aspect of the state's power.

== Rearguing the case ==
The case of Charles River Bridge v. Warren Bridge began again, on January 19, 1837. Warren Dutton and Daniel Webster represented the Charles River Bridge Company; Simon Greenleaf, a Harvard Law School professor, and John Davis, a senator and former governor from Massachusetts, represented Warren Bridge Company.

The lawyers defending the Warren Bridge said that exclusive rights were not mentioned in the charter. The Charles River Bridge lawyers countered that, even though competing bridges were never explicitly addressed in the charter, it was implied in the contract that the Charles River Bridge Company had exclusivity to the bridge traffic between Charlestown and Boston.

The Charles River Bridge lawyers appealed to the Court by arguing that the Court's prime interest should be to protect the property interests of the nation. "I look to the law, to the administration of the law, and, above all, to the supremacy of the law, as it resides in this court," Dutton said, "for the protection of the rights of persons and property, against all encroachments by the inadvertent legislation of the states. So long as this court shall continue to exercise this most salutary and highest of all its functions, the whole legislation of the country will be kept within its constitutional sphere of action."

The plaintiffs discussed what effect the Supreme Court's decision would have on the security of property rights and on the general public around the country. Dutton stated that ten million dollars of property was at stake in Massachusetts alone. He argued that if the Court sided with the defense, the public would then be able to urge the legislature to render other corporations' property valueless, as it had for the Charles River Bridge Company. Dutton further claimed that since the Warren Bridge had now taken all of the traffic of the Charles River Bridge, the construction of the Warren Bridge had been an act of confiscation, and that the property of the plaintiffs had been taken from them and given to the public. If the Court sided with Warren Bridge, Dutton argued, then "all sense of security for the rights of persons and property would be lost."

The Warren Bridge lawyers responded that the state legislature's power was more limited than its opponents believed, and that the legislature did not have the power to give exclusive rights to a private enterprise such as the Charles River Bridge Company. Greenleaf argued that the legislature was entrusted with the right to "provide safe and convenient public ways," and that this right was to be used to benefit the public good; clearly, giving the Charles River Bridge Company exclusive rights would not better the public. The Warren Bridge lawyers also argued on the basis of eminent domain, which enables federal and state governments to take private property for public use as long as it provides the owner with compensation. The defense argued that this was a state, not federal, issue, and should not even be heard in the United States Supreme Court. Finally, the Warren Bridge lawyers pointed out that the Charles River Bridge was not an isolated situation; other enterprises had lost money because of public improvements, such as highways, which lost tolls when railroads were built.

== Deciding the case ==
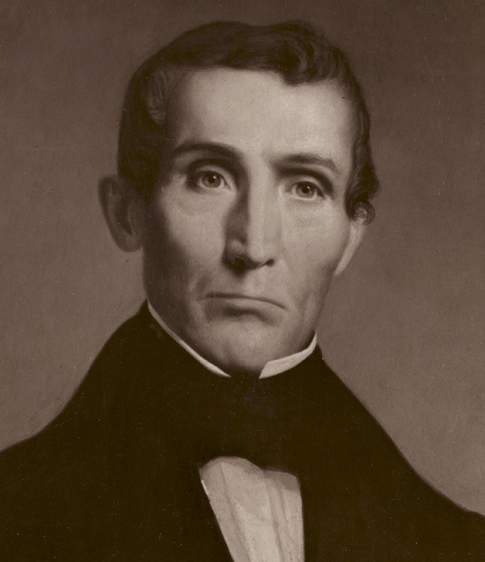
Roger B. Taney c. 1836, as the newly appointed Chief Justice

A decision was read on February 14, 1837, which was 5-2 in favor of Warren Bridge. Taney read the majority opinion. Justice John McLean read an opinion stating that he was in favor of the Charles River Bridge company but that it was not the Supreme Court's place to make a decision. Justice Story read a dissenting opinion entirely in favor of the Charles River Bridge Company.

In his opinion, Taney argued that the case was strictly about interpretation of contract, and that the charter contract should be interpreted as narrowly as possible, which meant that the Charles River Bridge did not have exclusive rights. He also stated that, in general, public grants should be interpreted closely and if there is ever any uncertainty in a contract, the decision made should be one to better the public. He said, "While the rights of private property are sacredly guarded, we must not forget that the community also have rights, and that the happiness and well-being of every citizen depends on their faithful preservation." In his remarks, Taney also explored what the negative effects on the country would be if the Court had sided with the Charles River Bridge Company. He stated that had that been the decision of the Court, transportation would be affected around the whole country. Taney made the point that with the rise of technology, canals and railroads had started to take away business from highways, and if charters granted monopolies to corporations, then these sorts of transportation improvements would not be able to flourish. If this were the case then, Taney said, the country would "be thrown back to the improvements of the last century, and obliged to stand still".

All told, it was one of the longest set of opinions in Supreme Court history up to that point.

== Reactions ==
The reactions to Bridge generally varied according to the political views of the critic in questions. Democrats were very much in favor of the decision because they saw it as a victory for states' rights, one of the party's leading platforms at the time. One Democratic magazine wrote, in regard to Taney's opinion, "he pursues his unbroken chain of clear, logical reasoning, spreads light all around, leaving no cloud to confound or mislead those who may come after him."

The Whig Party, on the other hand, was much more disapproving of the decision. Members of the party felt that the Massachusetts legislature had violated its contract, and that it was the federal government's responsibility to fix the state's mistake. The federal government's failure to do so led the Whigs to believe that the power of the federal government was in decline. The Whigs, who were largely businessmen, also feared that corporate property now had no legal protection. Chancellor James Kent wrote in the Whig magazine The New York Review, "A gathering gloom is cast over the future. We seem to have sunk suddenly below the horizon, to have lost the light of the sun." (2 New York Review 372, 385 (1838)) Many prominent men, including Daniel Webster and Chancellor Kent, a well-known jurist, expressed their disappointment in the Supreme Court for allegedly violating the Constitution. Kent wrote, in a letter to Justice Story, "The court has fallen from its high station and commanding dignity, and has lost its energy, and spirit of independence, and accuracy, and surrendered up to the spirit of the day, the true principles of the Constitution."

== See also ==
- List of United States Supreme Court cases, volume 36
