= Philip P. Barbour =

US Supreme Court justice from 1836 to 1841

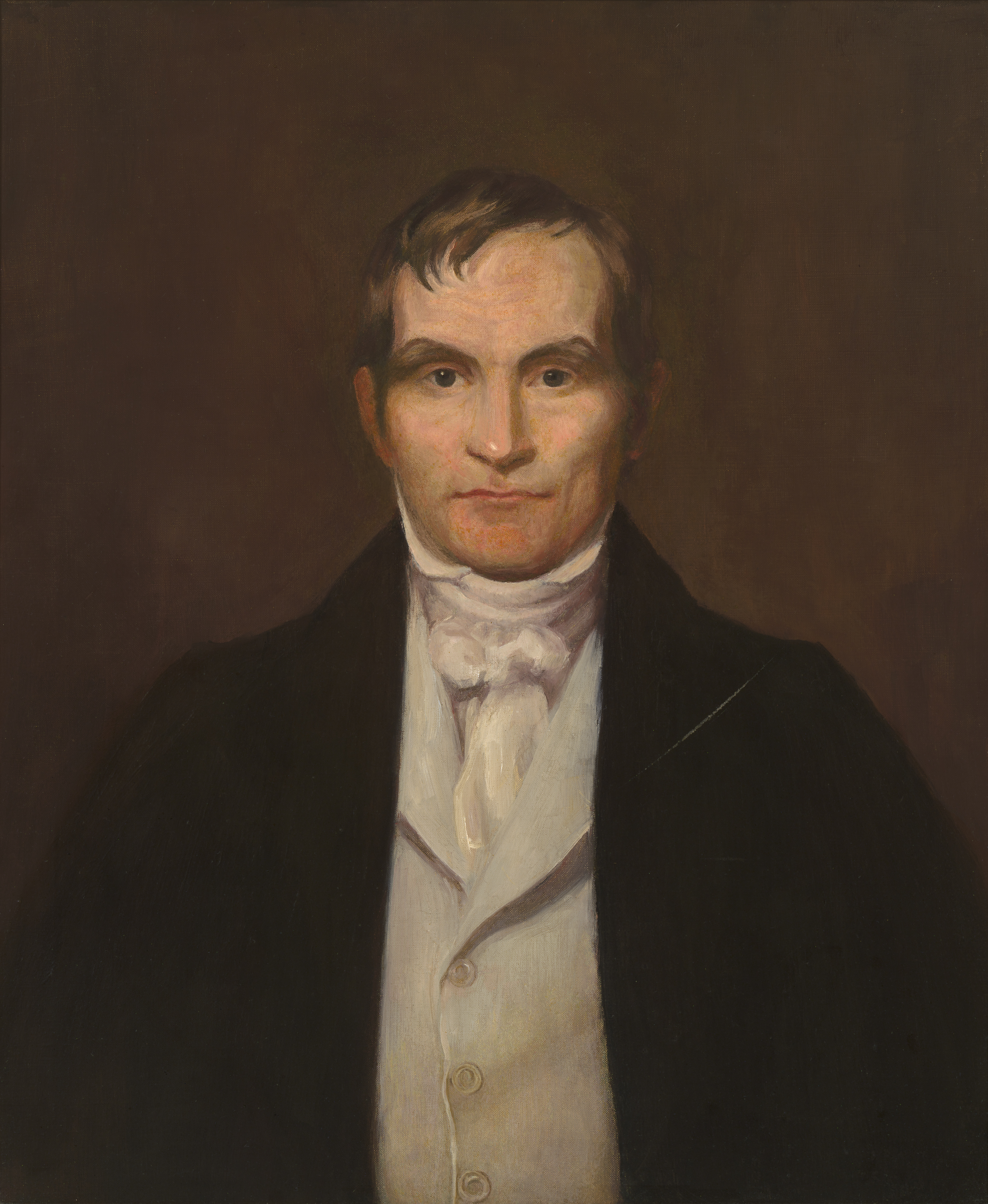
- Posthumous portrait, c. 1911

Associate Justice of the Supreme Court of the United States
- In office May 12, 1836 – February 25, 1841
- Nominated by: Andrew Jackson
- Preceded by: Gabriel Duvall
- Succeeded by: Peter V. Daniel

Judge of the United States District Court for the Eastern District of Virginia
- In office October 8, 1830 – March 17, 1836
- Nominated by: Andrew Jackson
- Preceded by: George Hay
- Succeeded by: Peter Daniel

Chair of the House Judiciary Committee
- In office 1827–1829
- Preceded by: Daniel Webster
- Succeeded by: James Buchanan

10th Speaker of the United States House of Representatives
- In office December 4, 1821 (Note: multi-ballot election; voting lasted one day (The total vacancy was almost exactly eight months; Congress simply did not work until December.)) – March 4, 1823
- Preceded by: John Taylor
- Succeeded by: Henry Clay

Member of the U.S. House of Representatives from Virginia's 11th district
- In office March 4, 1827 – October 15, 1830
- Preceded by: Robert Taylor
- Succeeded by: John Patton
- In office September 19, 1814 – March 4, 1825
- Preceded by: John Dawson
- Succeeded by: Robert Taylor

Personal details
- Born: May 25, 1783 Gordonsville, Virginia, U.S.
- Died: February 25, 1841 (aged 57) Washington, D.C., U.S.
- Party: Democratic-Republican (Before 1825); Democratic (1828–1841)
- Other political affiliations: Jacksonian
- Education: College of William & Mary

Philip Pendleton Barbour (May 25, 1783 – February 25, 1841) was the tenth speaker of the United States House of Representatives and an associate justice of the Supreme Court of the United States. He is the only individual to serve in both positions.

Born in Gordonsville, Virginia, Barbour established a legal career in Gordonsville after studying at the College of William & Mary. Several members of Barbour's family, including his brother, James Barbour, went on to hold prominent political office. Barbour won election to the House of Representatives in 1814 as a member of the Democratic-Republican Party. He served a single term as Speaker from 1821 to 1823 and declined to seek re-election to Congress in 1824. Barbour returned to Congress in 1827 as an ally of Andrew Jackson.

Barbour served in Congress until 1830, when he accepted appointment as a judge of the United States District Court for the Eastern District of Virginia. President Jackson appointed Barbour to the Supreme Court in 1835 to fill a vacancy caused by the resignation in 1835 of Gabriel Duvall. Barbour served on the Court until his death in 1841. On the Court, Barbour generally supported Jacksonian principles and states' rights.

== Early and family life ==
Barbour was born near Gordonsville, Orange County, Virginia, as the son of a planter, Thomas Barbour, who was a legislator, neighbor and early political sponsor of James Madison. He was named for his ancestor Philip Pendleton, through whom he was related to Edmund Pendleton, a politician and judge. The family was one of the First Families of Virginia, descended from a Scottish merchant who married a Miss Taliaferro and made his home in nearby Culpeper County, Virginia.

Like his brother James Barbour, Philip attended common and private schools before beginning formal legal studies under jurist St. George Tucker in Williamsburg, Virginia, but financial circumstances forced Tucker to end this arrangement in 1799.

He soon moved to Kentucky to make his fortune, where after a year reading law, he was admitted to the bar, and began practicing law in Bardstown. After another year, friends persuaded him to return to Virginia and resume his studies at the College of William & Mary, so in 1802, he began practicing law near his family home in Gordonsville.

In 1804, Barbour married a local planter's daughter, Frances Johnson, with whom he had one son named Sextus Barbour. Barbour was a slave owner.

== Political and early judicial career ==
Barbour practiced law for eight years before he started his public life as a member of the Virginia House of Delegates from 1812 to 1814. When U.S. Representative John Dawson died, Barbour won the special election to fill the seat, and served as a Jeffersonian Republican in the U.S. House of Representatives from September 19, 1814 to March 4, 1825, reaching the office of Speaker from 1821 to 1823. Barbour entered politics as the nation witnessed a political shift in which former state's rights activists such as current President James Madison, Henry Clay, and his brother James, now a U.S. Senator, began supporting nationalistic policies. Throughout this shift in power, Philip Barbour remained a strong advocate of Jeffersonian "Old Republican" principles of states' rights and maintaining a strict construction of the Constitution.

=== First term in Congress ===
Barbour's reputation for constitutional conservatism grew with his opposition to the Bonus Bill of 1817. The Bill permitted the federal funding of internal improvement projects such as building roads like that being constructed to connect Buffalo, New York to New Orleans, Louisiana, through Washington. Barbour viewed federally funded internal projects as outside the sphere of Congress' powers and therefore unconstitutional and undermining state sovereignty. Barbour viewed states as sovereign, political communities, independent of an overarching political dynasty and free to secede from the Union if the federal government infringed on the rights of the states, an argument that he employed when countering restrictions to Missouri's admission to the Union as a slave state.

Barbour also defended Missouri's ban on free Black Americans entering the state. To those who argued that this ban was a violation of Article IV of the Constitution, he replied that banning free Black Americans was no different than banning destitute white men who would become a burden on the state. He argued that the term "citizen" did not apply to Black Americans, whether free or not.

His opposition to national restrictions on slave states served to foment his passion for states' rights but also develop his pro-slavery argument in politics. As a Congressman, Barbour was the first prominent politician to openly contest the constitutionality of protective tariffs.

==== Cohens v. Virginia ====
In Cohens v. Virginia (1821), Congressman Barbour represented the Commonwealth of Virginia to argue the issue of the Supreme Court's jurisdiction to hear the case, in which two men from Baltimore were convicted for selling D.C. lottery tickets in Virginia. Barbour unsuccessfully argued that the Supreme Court lacked jurisdiction, since the law banning the sale of foreign lottery tickets was not meant to affect Virginia, rendering this a purely local issue. He also maintained that the suit was barred by the Eleventh Amendment, which prohibits suit against a state without its consent. However, Chief Justice Marshall held that the Court had jurisdiction based on the Supremacy Clause, Art. VI, cl. 2. This case strengthened Barbour's reputation as an Old Republican leader in a political system in which Virginian influence was waning and power was shifting between parties with the election of Andrew Jackson as the seventh President of the United States.

==== Jacksonian Democratic-Republican Party ====
Andrew Jackson's election in 1828 led to the bifurcation of the Old Republican Party into the Jacksonian Democratic Republicans and the opposing National Republicans. Jackson formed the Democratic party on the foundation of Old Republican principles, such as Jefferson's displeasure with Hamilton's National Bank. During his two terms, President Jackson destroyed the Second Bank of the United States, and advocated for individual liberty, states' rights, and slavery.

=== State judge and second term in Congress ===
Barbour declined to run for re-election in 1824 and turned down an offer from Thomas Jefferson to become the professor of law at the University of Virginia in 1825. Instead, he accepted election by Virginia legislature as a judge of the General Court of Virginia succeeding the late Hugh Holmes. Barbour served for two years as a state judge.

In 1827, Barbour returned to his seat in the House of Representatives as a Jacksonian. For the first two years of his second stint in the House, he was Chairman of the Judiciary Committee.

In 1829, Barbour became one of the first Jeffersonian Old Republicans to join the Jacksonian Democrats in opposition to the National Bank. He fought to expose the Second Bank of the United States as a private enterprise, endowed with federal funds while only masquerading as a government institution. Although his anti-Bank campaign did not take hold, Barbour's advocacy for state sovereignty, the removal of the National Bank, and the legalization of slavery in territories such as Missouri earned him favor with President Andrew Jackson.

Also in 1829, while continuing to serve as a U.S. Representative, Barbour became a delegate for the Virginia Constitutional Convention of 1829-1830, and the Convention elected him their second president, after the Convention's first president, James Monroe, had to withdraw due to failing health on December 8. As such, Barbour (with distinguished Virginians such as Monroe, James Madison, and John Marshall) helped restrict discussion of slavery's role in the Commonwealth, and limited the rancorous assembly's debates to issues of representation and suffrage (Virginia had been one of the last states to allow only landowners to vote, and slaveholders had disproportionate power). The resulting constitution was adopted in 1830, despite the votes against it from the state's northern and western areas (much of which ultimately split off to become West Virginia during the American Civil War decades after Barbour's death).

=== Federal district judge and the 1832 campaign season ===
Barbour also turned down offers of a chancellorship and the post of U.S. Attorney General before finally resigning his congressional seat October 15, 1830 to accept President Jackson's appointment to become judge of the United States District Court for the Eastern District of Virginia. Jackson appointed Barbour by recess appointment on October 8, 1830, to a seat on that court vacated by George Hay. Barbour was formally nominated on December 14, 1830, and two days later he was confirmed by the Senate, and received his commission, serving thereafter until March 17, 1836.

In 1832, Democrats unhappy with the selection of Martin Van Buren as their party's vice-presidential nominee held a convention in Virginia, at which they nominated Jackson for president and Barbour for vice president. Barbour eventually withdrew his candidacy and endorsed the Jackson-Van Buren ticket, but the alternative Democratic ticket still appeared on the ballot in several Southern states. Barbour also refused nominations for judge of the court of appeals, for Governor, and for United States Senator.

Although it was unknown whether Barbour could gain favor with voters outside Virginia, Barbour's campaigning on the Democratic ticket illuminated the similarities in parties and gained favor for the Democratic party. Voters reasoned that, if a man like Barbour, loyal to his party even when his fellow Virginians chose different principles, could switch to the Democratic party, then the Democrats must hold the same values. By joining the Jacksonian Democratic Party, Barbour entrenched Old Republican principles into a new political dynasty, therefore continuing the legacy of Jefferson and further validating the strength of Democratic principles. This was similar to Lincoln's argument that secession should not occur due to the state of perpetual Union that had existed since the first draft of the Constitution before the term "Union" was first used to describe the North during the Civil War. Therefore, Barbour's resignation allowed the second party system to coalesce by unifying the Democratic Party on the ideologies of war in the American system through the national reform retrenchment and economy, and a restoration of republican constitutionalism.

== United States Supreme Court ==
=== Appointment ===
In 1835, Chief Justice Marshall's death and Justice Gabriel Duvall's resignation created two vacancies on the Supreme Court. President Jackson, at the end of his second Presidential term, nominated Judge Barbour to fill Duvall's vacancy. Nationalists feared Jackson's appointment of Barbour because Barbour's anti-administration Congressional legacy and Democratic beliefs suggested that he would attempt to undermine the federal supremacy achieved during the Marshall Court. This fear made the finalization of the decision an arduous process with two attempts at delaying the Senate's decision. On March 15, 1836, the Senate approved the appointment of Barbour by a vote of 30-11.

=== Tenure ===
Barbour served on the Supreme Court for five years. He heard 155 cases, for which he authored one major opinion and two dissents. His passion for states' rights, strict constructionism, and limits on federal power helped shape the legacy of the Taney Court.

During Barbour's first term (1837), he heard three cases that mitigated Marshall's accomplishment of judicial nationalism, Briscoe v. Bank of the Commonwealth of Kentucky, Charles River Bridge v. Warren Bridge, and New York v. Miln. Justice Barbour authored the majority opinion in New York v. Miln. In 1824, the state of New York passed a law that required all ship masters to provide a report delineating personal information of passengers in order to prevent smuggling and immigration of the impoverished for whom the state could not provide. Ship master Miln refused to comply with the law and was therefore jailed and fined. The case went to the Court on the issue of whether the statute violated the Commerce Clause, U.S. Const., Art. 1, § 8. Barbour held that the New York statute did not violate the Commerce Clause, because it was an exercise of the power granted to the state to "regulate their internal police and to take care that no detriment comes to the commonwealth." People were "not the subject of commerce, and not being imported goods, cannot fall within a train of reasoning founded upon the construction of a power given to Congress to regulate commerce and the prohibition to the states from imposing a duty on imported goods." Justice Barbour argued that the statute was valid as an act of police power to protect the health and welfare of the community. Because it is within the powers of the state to have jurisdiction over its people and things within its territorial boundaries, then "the authority of a state is complete, unqualified, and exclusive."

Justice Barbour's holding in Miln was supported by Taney's opinion in Charles River Bridge that the people have rights and it is the duty of both the state and the nation to preserve those rights in order to ensure the happiness and welfare of every citizen. Miln helped Barbour develop a states' rights constitutional vision for the Supreme Court, by narrowing the scope of federal commerce power while expanding state policing power. For both Briscoe v. Bank of the Commonwealth of Kentucky and Charles River Bridge v. Warren Bridge, Barbour voted with the majority, simultaneously gaining more power for states and weakening Marshall Court nationalism.

While Barbour did not spend enough time on the court to amass a large body of judicial opinions, he authored dissents in Kendall v. United States ex rel. Stokes (1838) and Holmes v. Jennison (1840). These two dissents sought to diminish federal authority by supporting Jacksonian political aspirations and opposing restrictions to state sovereignty. Kendall dealt with judicial supervision of executive acts. In 1835, President Jackson appointed Amos Kendall the Postmaster General for the United States. A firm, Stockton and Stokes, had had a contract with the previous Postmaster General, and demanded payment of outstanding debts thereunder, which Kendall declined, in favor of the debt-ridden U.S. Postal Service's other creditors.

The Court viewed Kendall as a proceeding against an Executive Branch official who acted within the scope of his powers. The Court dealt with the issues of whether it had jurisdiction to hear the case under Section 25 of the Judiciary Act of 1789 and whether it had the power to issue a writ of mandamus under Section 13 of the Judiciary Act of 1789 to an official of the Executive Branch. The majority held that the Supreme Court could issue a writ of mandamus to "compel the Postmaster General to perform any ministerial duty devolved on him by law." This issue and holding is similar to that in Marbury v. Madison (1803), which also involved writs of mandamus to an executive officer and held that the Supremacy Clause in Article VI and the notion of popular sovereignty granted the Court jurisdiction over state court cases and the power of judicial review to make legitimate and final rulings on constitutional questions.

Justices Taney and Catron concurred with Barbour's opinion that it was never within the scope of judicial power to control executive actions. Although Barbour believed that "Congress has the constitutional power to give to the federal judiciary …authority to issue the writ of mandamus," Barbour did not believe that the lower court had the "power to issue the writ in question". Even though the Postmaster General was subject to direction and control of the President with respect of the duties imposed by law, when the law is 'ministerial,' Congress can limit and regulate the executive officials. Because Congress created the executive office, then Congress could monitor executive decisions, but the President is not controlled by the federal courts. While the majority opinion served to further define separation of powers by holding acts of the executive branch as subject to the rulings of the Supreme Court, Barbour's dissenting opinion sought to discourage judicial supervision of executive acts by applying President Jackson's departmental theory, the notion that the executive branch has the right to interpret the Constitution for itself. Barbour's opinion in Kendall demonstrated his loyalty to President Jackson's political agenda.

Barbour made his most powerful argument in favor of states' rights in Holmes v. Jennison (1840), which focused on the extradition of a fugitive from Vermont to Canada. In 1838, George Holmes, a resident of Quebec, was convicted of murdering Louis Paschal Achille Tache in Canada. Holmes escaped to the United States where he was detained under issue of warrant in Vermont. Silas H. Jennison, the governor of Vermont, issued the warrant stating that Holmes, being a citizen of the lower province of Canada, would be arrested and returned to suffer prosecution according to the Canadian justice system, even though the United States had no extradition treaty with Canada. Because the Vermont Supreme Court refused to issue a writ of habeas corpus, Holmes petitioned to the Supreme Court on grounds that he was unlawfully imprisoned and deprived of his personal liberties.

The case became a contentious debate further polarizing the Court between nationalists and states' rights Justices. Holmes focused on whether the Court had the authority to review the case based on Section 25 of the Judiciary Act of 1789 and whether the governor's warrant violated the Extradition Clause of Article IV, section 2 of the Constitution, which gave the federal government power to surrender a fugitive to a foreign government. Chief Justice Taney believed that the case fell within the Court's jurisdiction and that the federal government had the exclusive power to engage in foreign relations and so believed that the governor had violated the Extradition Clause.

However, as the Court divided 4-4 over the issue of jurisdiction, the Court dismissed the petition. The Vermont Supreme Court subsequently ordered Holmes released in light of the fact that five of the eight Justices expressed the opinion that the governor had violated the Extradition Clause, an expression of the principle that the Constitution gives state officers no power to take independent actions concerned with foreign governments. Barbour was one of the four Justices who disagreed with the Chief Justice. Barbour believed that, because "there is no treaty on the subject of surrendering fugitives," between Vermont and Canada, then the returning of fugitives to Canada did not violate a power granted to the federal government by the Constitution, and therefore the "authority, exercised by the Governor of Vermont, is not repugnant to the power of making treaties in its dormant state, because, in the language of the Chief Justice before cited, it is not the mere existence of the power but its exercise which is incompatible with the exercise of the same power by the states." Barbour opined that, because the Constitution did not explicitly define the affairs of states with foreign countries, Governor Jennison was completely within his rights to order the extradition.

Barbour's opinion in Holmes accorded with his opinion in New York v. Miln that the state has the duty to maintain the welfare of its people. Holmes v. Jennison provides an example of Barbour's strict reading of the Constitution, which allowed him to read a more pronounced states' rights view into the text.

== Death and legacy ==
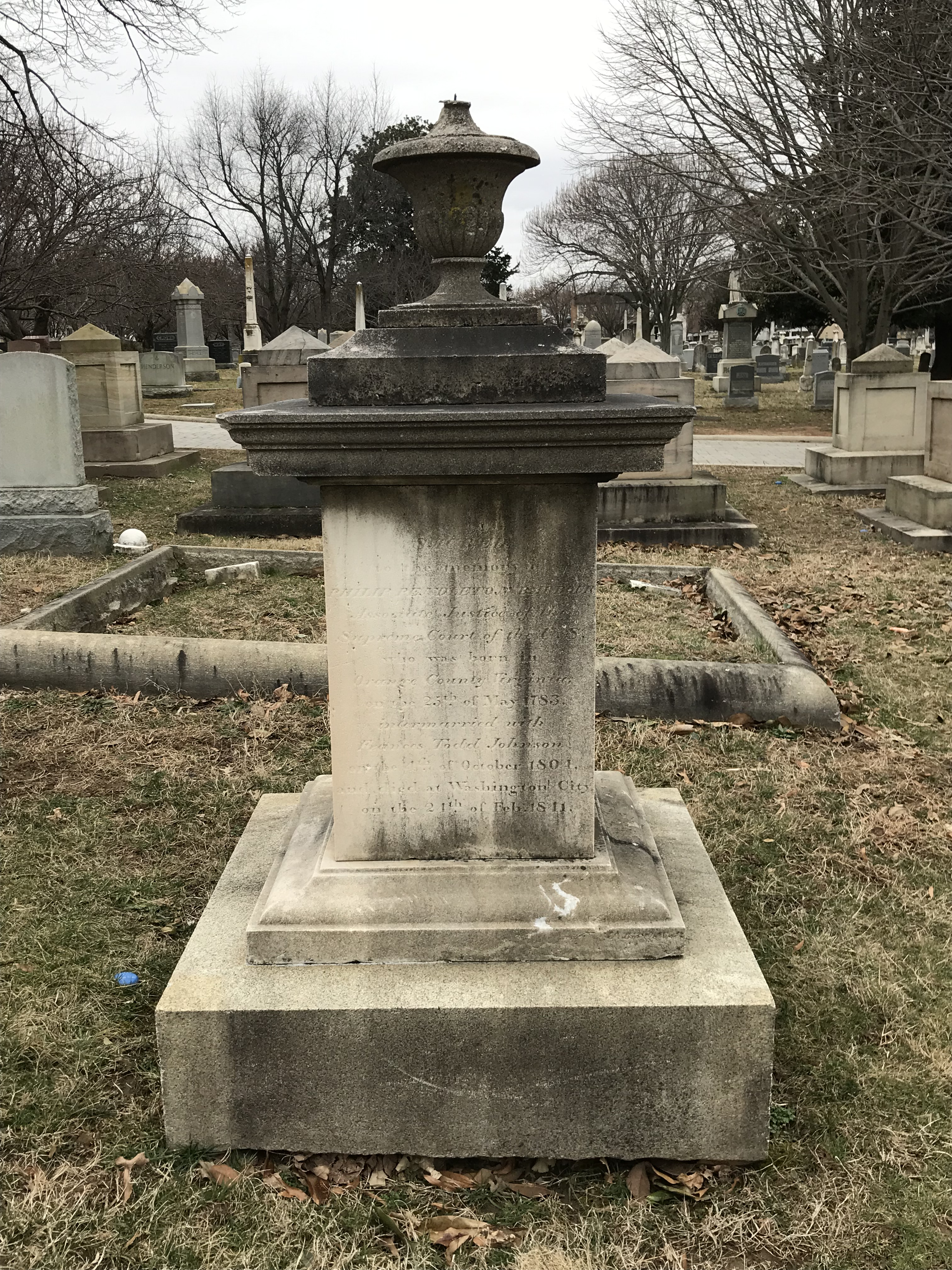
Barbour's gravesite

Barbour died of a coronary thrombosis on February 25, 1841, while asleep in his bed, and partway through the arguments of John Quincy Adams, who sought freedom for African captives in the Amistad Case. Justice Story (although opposing slavery and personally more nationalist than Barbour) eulogized Barbour as earning the respect of his colleagues by his commitment to personal values, persistence in fighting for his beliefs, and legal acumen.

Barbour owned fifty-four slaves at the time of the 1840 census.

An Episcopalian throughout his life, Philip Pendleton Barbour was buried in the Congressional Cemetery, Washington, D.C. Barbour's long-time friend and fellow Virginian, Peter V. Daniel, succeeded him on the U.S. Supreme Court, and continued Barbour's legacy of maintaining Jacksonian principles, states' rights, and strict constructionist reading of the Constitution.

Locations named after him include Barbour County, West Virginia, Philippi, West Virginia and its Philip Barbour High School.

Barbour's tenure on the Court demonstrated his loyalty to President Jackson's national vision while applying a narrowed reading of state's rights into the Constitution. Barbour's decisions in major Court cases created an enduring Jacksonian legacy on the Taney Court. Barbour's furtherance of Jacksonian principles of departmental theory in his Kendall dissent, his states' rights advocacy in his majority opinion in New York v. Miln, and textualist reading of the Constitution in order to distinguish state from Congressional power in his dissent in Holmes, all served in this regard.

Barbour's opinions began to unravel the work of Marshall's Court, and set a precedent for future cases as the country became more polarized. Barbour's arguments for the authority of the President to interpret the Constitution in Kendall, and those in defense of the states' police power in Cohens v. Virginia, allowed Chief Justice Taney to rule that slaves were not citizens in Dred Scott v. Sanford (1857). Ironically, they were also used by President Abraham Lincoln to issue a suspension of habeas corpus in 1861.

== See also ==
- Virginia Constitutional Convention of 1829-1830
- List of justices of the Supreme Court of the United States

Note(s)

U.S. House of Representatives
Preceded by John Dawson	Member of the U.S. House of Representatives from Virginia's 11th congressional district 1814–1825	Succeeded by Robert Taylor
Preceded by Robert Taylor	Member of the U.S. House of Representatives from Virginia's 11th congressional district 1827–1830	Succeeded by John Patton
Preceded by Daniel Webster	Chairman of the House Judiciary Committee; 1827–1829	Succeeded by James Buchanan
Political offices
Preceded by John Taylor	Speaker of the U.S. House of Representatives; 1821–1823	Succeeded by Henry Clay
Legal offices
Preceded by George Hay	Judge of the United States District Court for the Eastern District of Virginia; 1830–1836	Succeeded by Peter Daniel
Preceded by Gabriel Duvall	Associate Justice of the Supreme Court of the United States; 1836–1841	Succeeded by Peter Daniel
