= Contract Clause =

Clause of the U.S. Constitution which prohibits certain actions by state governments

Article I, Section 10, Clause 1 of the United States Constitution, known as the Contract Clause, imposes certain prohibitions on the states. These prohibitions are meant to protect individuals from intrusion by state governments and to keep the states from intruding on the enumerated powers of the U.S. federal government.

Among other things, this clause prohibits states from issuing their own money and from enacting legislation relieving particular persons of their contractual obligations. Although the clause recognizes people's right to form contracts, it does not prohibit state legislatures to create laws barring contracts offending public policy, such as contracts for sex or for child labor. Likewise, though prohibited from creating a state currency, states are not barred from making "gold and silver coin a tender in payment of debts".

== Text ==
No State shall enter into any Treaty, Alliance, or Confederation; grant Letters of Marque and Reprisal; coin Money; emit Bills of Credit; make any Thing but gold and silver Coin a Tender in Payment of Debts; pass any Bill of Attainder, ex post facto Law, or Law impairing the Obligation of Contracts, or grant any Title of Nobility.

— United States Constitution Article I, § 10, Clause 1

== Treaties, alliances, or confederations ==
At the time of the Civil War, this clause was one of the provisions upon which the Supreme Court relied in holding that the Confederation formed by the seceding States (the States that withdrew from membership in a federal union) could not be recognized as having any legal existence. Today, its practical significance lies in the limitations which it implies upon the power of the States to deal with matters having a bearing upon international relations. In the early case of Holmes v. Jennison, Chief Justice Taney, referencing the Contract Clause, wrote an opinion which found that states had no power under it to honor an extradition request from a foreign government. More recently, the kindred idea that the responsibility for the conduct of foreign relations rests exclusively with the Federal Government prompted the Court to hold that, since the oil under the three mile marginal belt along the California coast might well become the subject of international dispute and since the ocean, including this three mile belt, is of vital consequence to the nation in its desire to engage in commerce and to live in peace with the world, the Federal Government has paramount rights in and power over that belt, including full dominion over the resources of the soil under the water area. In Skiriotes v. Florida, (1941) the Court, on the other hand, ruled that this clause did not disallow Florida from regulating the manner in which its own citizens may engage in sponge fishing outside its territorial waters. Speaking for a unanimous Court, Chief Justice Hughes declared: “When its action does not conflict with federal legislation, the sovereign authority of the State over the conduct of its citizens upon the high seas is analogous to the sovereign authority of the United States over its citizens in like circumstances.”

== Bills of credit ==
In constitutional context, "bills of credit" mean paper medium of exchange intended to circulate between individuals, and between the Government and individuals, for the ordinary social purposes. Such papers do not need to be legal tender. Interest-bearing certificates in denominations up to ten dollars that were issued by loan offices established by the State of Missouri and made receivable in payment of taxes or other moneys due to the State, and in payment of the fees and salaries of state officers, were held to be bills of credit whose issuance was banned by this section. The States are not forbidden, however, to issue coupons receivable for taxes, nor to execute instruments binding themselves to pay money at a future day for services rendered or money borrowed. Bills issued by state banks are not bills of credit; it is immaterial that the State is the sole stockholder of the bank, that the officers of the bank were elected by the state legislature, or that the capital of the bank was raised by the sale of state bonds.

== Legal tender ==
Relying on this clause, the Supreme Court has held that the creditors should be paid in gold or silver, when the marshal of a state court seizes the property (bank notes) of the debtor within (a discharge of) an execution. However courts ruled valid the state laws providing that checks be drawn on local banks, as the Constitution does not prohibit a bank depositor from consenting when he draws a check that payment may be made by draft.

== Bills of attainder ==
Statutes enacted after the Civil War with the intent and result of excluding persons who had aided the Confederacy from following certain callings, by the device of requiring them to take an oath that they had never given such aid, were held invalid as being bills of attainder, as well as ex post facto laws.

Other attempts to raise bill-of-attainder claims have been unsuccessful. 5-4 Court majorities denied that a municipal ordinance that required all employees to execute oaths that they had never been affiliated with Communist or similar organizations, violated the clause, on the grounds that the ordinance merely provided standards of qualifications and eligibility for employment, and upheld a similar standard for admission to state bar. Later decisions all but overruled the membership standard on First Amendment grounds, holding that such membership was actionable only when coupled with the specific intent to achieve the end.

A law that prohibited any person convicted of a felony and not subsequently pardoned from holding office in a waterfront union was not a bill of attainder because the “distinguishing feature of a bill of attainder is the substitution of a legislative for a judicial determination of guilt” and the prohibition “embodies no further implications of appellant’s guilt than are contained in his 1920 judicial conviction.”

== Impairing the obligation of contracts ==
The Framers of the Constitution added this clause in response to the fear that states would continue a practice that had been widespread under the Articles of Confederation—that of granting "private relief." Legislatures would pass bills relieving particular persons (predictably, influential persons) of their obligation to pay their debts. It was this phenomenon that also prompted the framers to make bankruptcy law the province of the federal government.

During and after the Revolution, many states enacted laws favoring colonial debtors to the detriment of foreign creditors. Federalists, especially Alexander Hamilton, believed that such a practice would jeopardize the future flow of foreign capital into the fledgling United States. Consequently, the Contract Clause, by ensuring the inviolability of sales and financing contracts, encouraged an inflow of foreign capital by reducing the risk of loss to foreign merchants trading with and investing in the former colonies.

The clause does not prohibit the federal government from modifying or abrogating contracts. In Dartmouth College v. Woodward (1819), corporations gained contract protections of charters.

During the New Deal Era, the Supreme Court began to depart from the Lochner era constitutional interpretation of the Commerce Clause, Due Process, and the Contract Clause. In Home Building & Loan Association v. Blaisdell, the Supreme Court upheld a Minnesota law that temporarily restricted the ability of mortgage holders to foreclose. The law was enacted to prevent mass foreclosures during the Great Depression, a time of economic hardship in America. The kind of contract modification performed by the law in question was arguably similar to the kind that the Framers intended to prohibit, but the Supreme Court held that this law was a valid exercise of the state's police power, and that the temporary nature of the contract modification and the emergency of the situation justified the law.

Further cases have refined this holding, differentiating between governmental interference with private contracts and interference with contracts entered into by the government. There is more scrutiny when the government modifies a contract to alter its own obligations.

=== Modification of private contracts ===
The Supreme Court laid out a three-part test for whether a law conforms with the Contract Clause in Energy Reserves Group v. Kansas Power & Light. First, the state regulation must not substantially impair a contractual relationship. Second, the State "must have a significant and legitimate purpose behind the regulation, such as the remedying of a broad and general social or economic problem." Third, the law must be reasonable and appropriate for its intended purpose. This test is similar to rational basis review.

=== Modification of government contracts ===
In United States Trust Co. v. New Jersey, the Supreme Court held that a higher level of scrutiny was needed for situations where laws modified the government's own contractual obligations. In this case, New Jersey had issued bonds to finance the World Trade Center and had contractually promised the bondholders that the collateral would not be used to finance money-losing rail operations. Later, New Jersey attempted to modify law to allow financing of railway operations, and the bondholders successfully sued to prevent this from happening.

== See also ==
- Charles River Bridge v. Warren Bridge
- Contract law
- Dartmouth College v. Woodward
- Ogden v. Saunders
- Federalist No. 10, complete text at Wikisource.
- Fletcher v. Peck
- Reserved powers doctrine of the United States
