= List of United States Supreme Court cases, volume 40 =

Supreme Court of the United States
- Interactive map of Supreme Court of the United States
- 38°53′26″N 77°00′16″W
- Established: March 4, 1789; 237 years ago
- Location: Washington, D.C.
- Coordinates: 38°53′26″N 77°00′16″W
- Composition method: Presidential nomination with Senate confirmation
- Authorised by: Constitution of the United States, Art. III, § 1
- Judge term length: life tenure, subject to impeachment and removal
- Number of positions: 9 (by statute)
- Website: supremecourt.gov

This is a list of cases reported in volume 40 (15 Pet.) of United States Reports, decided by the Supreme Court of the United States in 1841.

== Nominative reports ==
In 1874, the U.S. government created the United States Reports, and retroactively numbered older privately-published case reports as part of the new series. As a result, cases appearing in volumes 1–90 of U.S. Reports have dual citation forms; one for the volume number of U.S. Reports, and one for the volume number of the reports named for the relevant reporter of decisions (these are called "nominative reports").

=== Richard Peters, Jr. ===
Starting with the 26th volume of U.S. Reports, the Reporter of Decisions of the Supreme Court of the United States was Richard Peters, Jr. Peters was Reporter of Decisions from 1828 to 1843, covering volumes 26 through 41 of United States Reports which correspond to volumes 1 through 16 of his Peters's Reports. As such, the dual form of citation to, for example, Levy v. Fitzpatrick is 40 U.S. (15 Pet.) 167 (1841).

== Justices of the Supreme Court at the time of 40 U.S. (15 Pet.) ==
The Supreme Court is established by Article III, Section 1 of the Constitution of the United States, which says: "The judicial Power of the United States, shall be vested in one supreme Court . . .". The size of the Court is not specified; the Constitution leaves it to Congress to set the number of justices. Under the Judiciary Act of 1789 Congress originally fixed the number of justices at six (one chief justice and five associate justices). Since 1789 Congress has varied the size of the Court from six to seven, nine, ten, and back to nine justices (always including one chief justice).

When the cases in 40 U.S. (15 Pet.) were decided the Court comprised nine justices at the start of the 1841 term, but only eight when it adjourned in March 1841; Justice Philip P. Barbour had died in February 1841.

Portrait	Justice	Office	Home State	Succeeded	Date confirmed by the Senate (Vote)	Tenure on Supreme Court
	Roger B. Taney	Chief Justice	Maryland	John Marshall	March 15, 1836 (29–15)	March 28, 1836 – October 12, 1864 (Died)
	Joseph Story	Associate Justice	Massachusetts	William Cushing	November 18, 1811 (Acclamation)	February 3, 1812 – September 10, 1845 (Died)
	Smith Thompson	Associate Justice	New York	Henry Brockholst Livingston	December 9, 1823 (Acclamation)	September 1, 1823 – December 18, 1843 (Died)
	John McLean	Associate Justice	Ohio	Robert Trimble	March 7, 1829 (Acclamation)	January 11, 1830 – April 4, 1861 (Died)
	Henry Baldwin	Associate Justice	Pennsylvania	Bushrod Washington	January 6, 1830 (41–2)	January 18, 1830 – April 21, 1844 (Died)
	James Moore Wayne	Associate Justice	Georgia	William Johnson	January 9, 1835 (Acclamation)	January 14, 1835 – July 5, 1867 (Died)
	Philip P. Barbour	Associate Justice	Virginia	Gabriel Duvall	March 15, 1836 (30–11)	May 12, 1836 – February 25, 1841 (Died)
	John Catron	Associate Justice	Tennessee	newly created seat	March 8, 1837 (28–15)	May 1, 1837 – May 30, 1865 (Died)
	John McKinley	Associate Justice	Alabama	newly created seat	September 25, 1837 (Acclamation)	January 9, 1838 – July 19, 1852 (Died)

== Notable Case in 40 U.S. (15 Pet.) ==
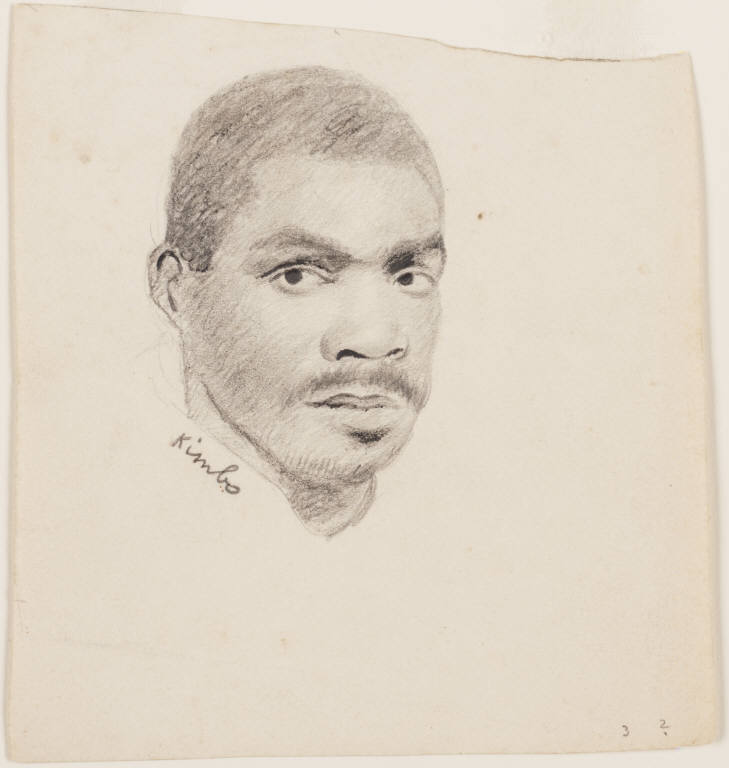
Portrait of Kimbo, one of 36 men aboard La Amistad, c. 1839–1840

=== The Schooner Amistad ===
The Schooner Amistad, 40 U.S. (15 Pet.) 518 (1841), resulted from the rebellion of kidnapped Africans on board the Spanish schooner La Amistad in 1839. It was an unusual freedom suit that involved international issues and parties as well as U.S. law. The lower courts ruled that the captives had acted as free men when they fought to escape their illegal confinement and were entitled to take whatever measures were necessary to secure their freedom, including the use of force. Under international and Southern sectional pressure, American President Martin Van Buren ordered the case appealed to the US Supreme Court, which affirmed the lower court ruling and authorized release of the captives.

== Citation style ==
Under the Judiciary Act of 1789 the federal court structure at the time comprised District Courts, which had general trial jurisdiction; Circuit Courts, which had mixed trial and appellate (from the US District Courts) jurisdiction; and the United States Supreme Court, which had appellate jurisdiction over the federal District and Circuit courts—and for certain issues over state courts. The Supreme Court also had limited original jurisdiction (i.e., in which cases could be filed directly with the Supreme Court without first having been heard by a lower federal or state court). There were one or more federal District Courts and/or Circuit Courts in each state, territory, or other geographical region.

Bluebook citation style is used for case names, citations, and jurisdictions.

- "C.C.D." = United States Circuit Court for the District of . . .
  - e.g.,"C.C.D.N.J." = United States Circuit Court for the District of New Jersey
- "D." = United States District Court for the District of . . .
  - e.g.,"D. Mass." = United States District Court for the District of Massachusetts
- "E." = Eastern; "M." = Middle; "N." = Northern; "S." = Southern; "W." = Western
  - e.g.,"C.C.S.D.N.Y." = United States Circuit Court for the Southern District of New York
  - e.g.,"M.D. Ala." = United States District Court for the Middle District of Alabama
- "Ct. Cl." = United States Court of Claims
- The abbreviation of a state's name alone indicates the highest appellate court in that state's judiciary at the time.
  - e.g.,"Pa." = Supreme Court of Pennsylvania
  - e.g.,"Me." = Supreme Judicial Court of Maine

== List of cases in 40 U.S. (15 Pet.) ==
Case Name	Page & year	Opinion of the Court	Concurring opinion(s)	Dissenting opinion(s)	Lower court	Disposition
Vaughan v. Northup	1 (1841)	Story	none	none	C.C.D.C.	affirmed
Gaines v. Relf	9 (1841)	Thompson	none	none	C.C.E.D. La.	certification
Coons' Lessee v. Gallaher	18 (1841)	Taney	none	none	Ohio	dismissed
Mayburry v. Brien	21 (1841)	McLean	none	none	C.C.D. Md.	affirmed
The North Carolina	40 (1841)	Taney	none	none	Ct. App. Terr. Fla.	reversed
Colin Mitchel v. United States	52 (1841)	Wayne	none	none	Fla. Super. Ct.	affirmed
Brush v. Ware	93 (1841)	McLean	none	none	C.C.D. Ohio	affirmed
Gorman v. Lenox's Executors	115 (1841)	McLean	none	none	C.C.D.C.	affirmed
Ex parte Crenshaw	119 (1841)	Taney	none	none	C.C.S.D. Ala.	decree nullified
Smith v. Clapp	125 (1841)	McKinley	none	none	C.C.S.D. Ala.	affirmed
United States v. Rodman	130 (1841)	Wayne	none	none	Fla. Super. Ct.	affirmed
United States v. Dickson	141 (1841)	Story	none	none	C.C.S.D. Miss.	affirmed
Levy v. Fitzpatrick	167 (1841)	McKinley	none	none	C.C.E.D. La.	dismissed
United States v. Forbes' Heirs	173 (1841)	Catron	none	none	Fla. Super. Ct.	reversed
United States v. Boyd	187 (1841)	Catron	none	none	C.C.S.D. Miss.	reversed
Amis v. Pearle	211 (1841)	Story	none	none	not indicated	dismissed
Lea v. Kelly	213 (1841)	Taney	none	none	C.C.S.D. Ala.	dismissed
Buyck v. United States	215 (1841)	Wayne	none	none	Fla. Super. Ct.	affirmed
United States v. Delespins's Heirs	226 (1841)	Wayne	none	none	Fla. Super. Ct.	affirmed
Rhode Island v. Massachusetts	233 (1841)	Taney	none	none	original	order to answer
O'Hara v. United States	275 (1841)	Wayne	none	none	Fla. Super. Ct.	affirmed
Gwin v. Breedlove	284 (1841)	Taney	none	none	C.C.S.D. Miss.	decree nullified
Young v. Smith	287 (1841)	Story	none	none	C.C.S.D. Ala.	dismissed
United States v. Linn	290 (1841)	Thompson	none	none	C.C.D. Ill.	certification
Gratiot v. United States	336 (1841)	Story	none	none	C.C.D. Mo.	reversed
United States v. Bank of the Metropolis	377 (1841)	Wayne	none	none	C.C.D.C.	affirmed
United States v. Fitzgerald	407 (1841)	McKinley	none	none	C.C.E.D. La.	affirmed
Minis v. United States	423 (1841)	Story	none	none	C.C.D. Ga.	affirmed
Groves v. Slaughter	449 (1841)	Thompson	McLean, Taney	none	C.C.E.D. La.	affirmed
The Schooner Amistad	518 (1841)	Story	none	none	C.C.D. Conn.	multiple

== See also ==
- Certificate of division
