= Timeline of the William Henry Harrison presidency =

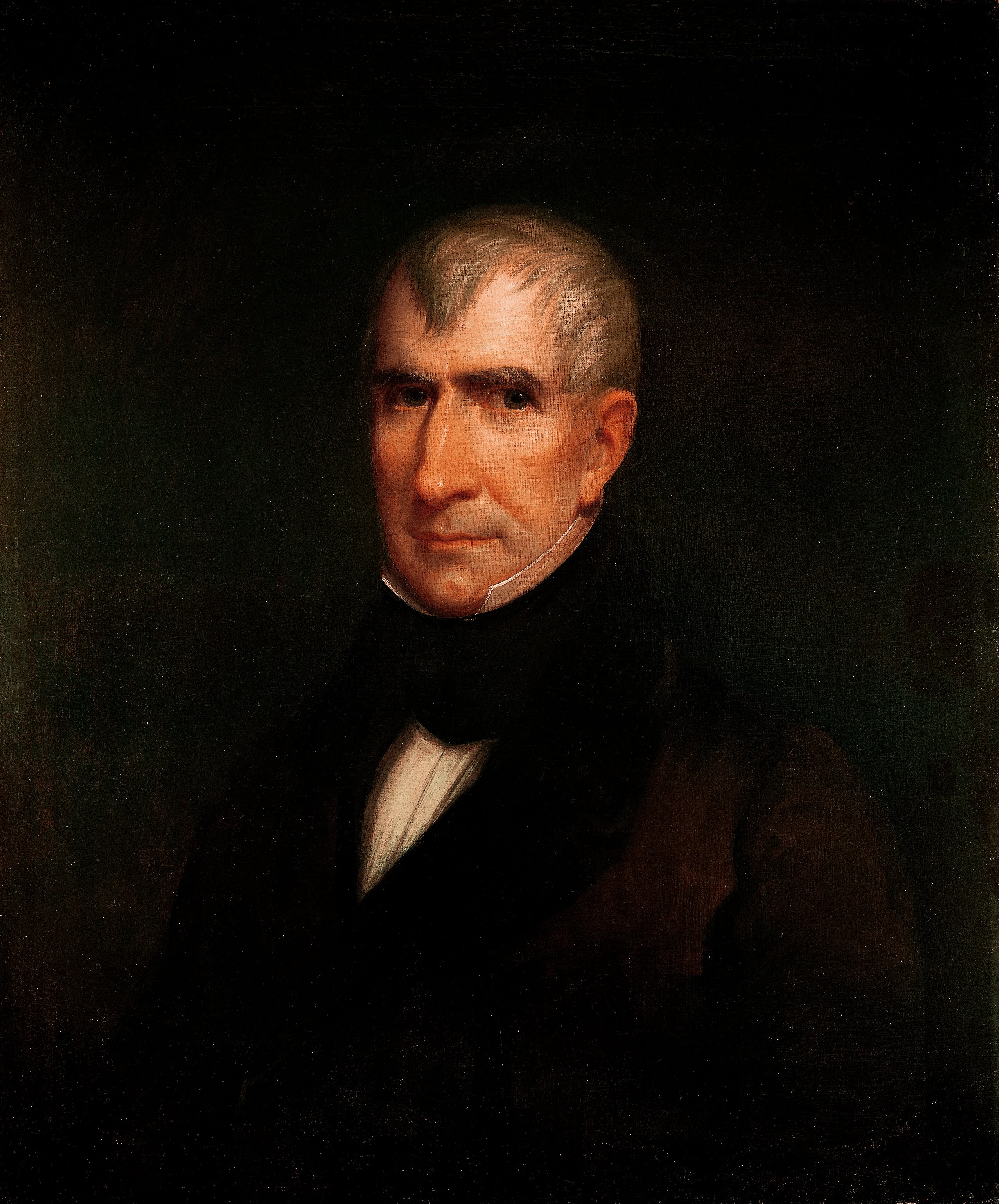
William Henry Harrison

The presidency of William Henry Harrison began on March 4, 1841, when William Henry Harrison was inaugurated as the 9th president of the United States, and ended with Harrison's death on April 4, 1841. Harrison's tenure was the shortest of any president, serving for only 31 days.

== 1841 ==
=== March 1841 ===
- March 4
  - William Henry Harrison is inaugurated as the ninth president of the United States. Harrison delivers an inaugural address that lasts one hour and forty minutes, which he delivers in the rain. Among the topics he discusses, Harrison proposes a constitutional amendment that would restrict the president to a single term. He also expresses his support for states' rights and opposition to overuse of presidential veto power.
  - John Tyler becomes vice president.
- March 5 – Daniel Webster, Thomas Ewing, John Bell, John J. Crittenden, and George Edmund Badger become secretary of state, secretary of the treasury, secretary of war, attorney general, and secretary of the navy, respectively.
- March 6 – Francis Granger becomes postmaster general.
- March 9 – The Supreme Court issues its decision in United States v. The Amistad. It rules that the people aboard La Amistad were victims of kidnapping, not slaves.
- March 10 – The Supreme Court issues its decision in Groves v. Slaughter. It rules that a state ban on importing slaves cannot take effect unless legislation is passed to enforce it.
- March 13 – Henry Clay writes a message to Harrison imploring him to call a special session of Congress to solve the issue of a national bank. Harrison gives a dismissive response that infuriates Clay.
- March 17 – Harrison calls for a special session of Congress to take place on May 31.
- March 26
  - Harrison writes his last known letter, asking Edward Curtis, the Collector of the Port of New York, to hire a veteran whom Harrison had served with.
  - Harrison is determined to be "slightly ailing".
- March 27 – Harrison falls seriously ill.

=== April 1841 ===
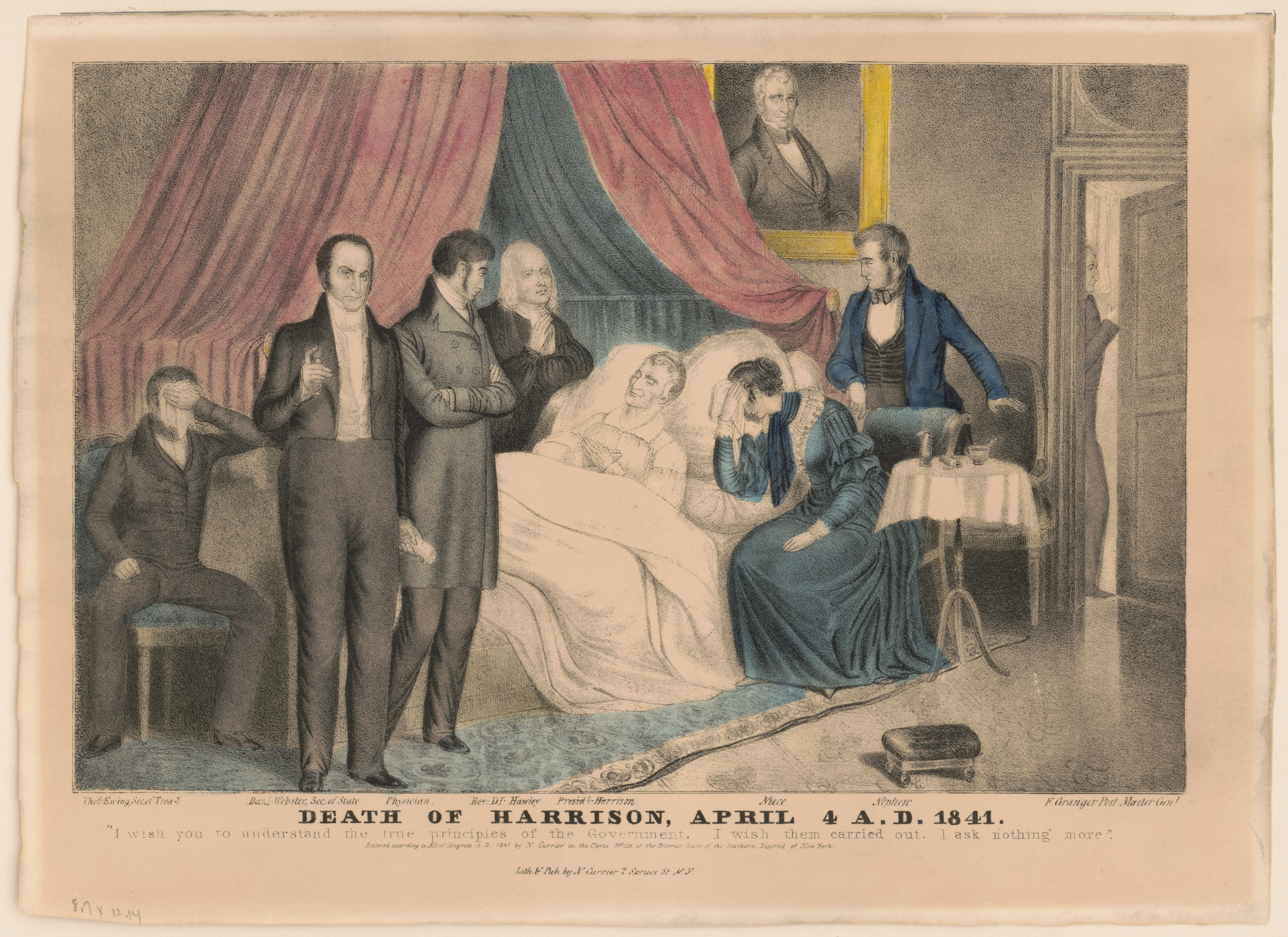
"Death of Harrison"

- April 3 – The four physicians tending to Harrison determine that he will not survive his illness.
- April 4 – Harrison dies of pneumonia. This is the first time a president has died in office, and the rules of presidential succession have not yet been thoroughly defined. Vice President John Tyler will subsequently take the oath of office and set the precedent that the vice president becomes president, not acting president, when the incumbent dies.

== Works cited ==
- Cleaves, Freeman (1939). Old Tippecanoe: William Henry Harrison and His Time. Charles Scribner's Sons. ISBN 9-945707-01-0.
- Collins, Gail (2012). William Henry Harrison. Henry Holt and Company. ISBN 978-0-8050-9118-2.
