= George Mathews (judge) =

American judge (1774–1836)

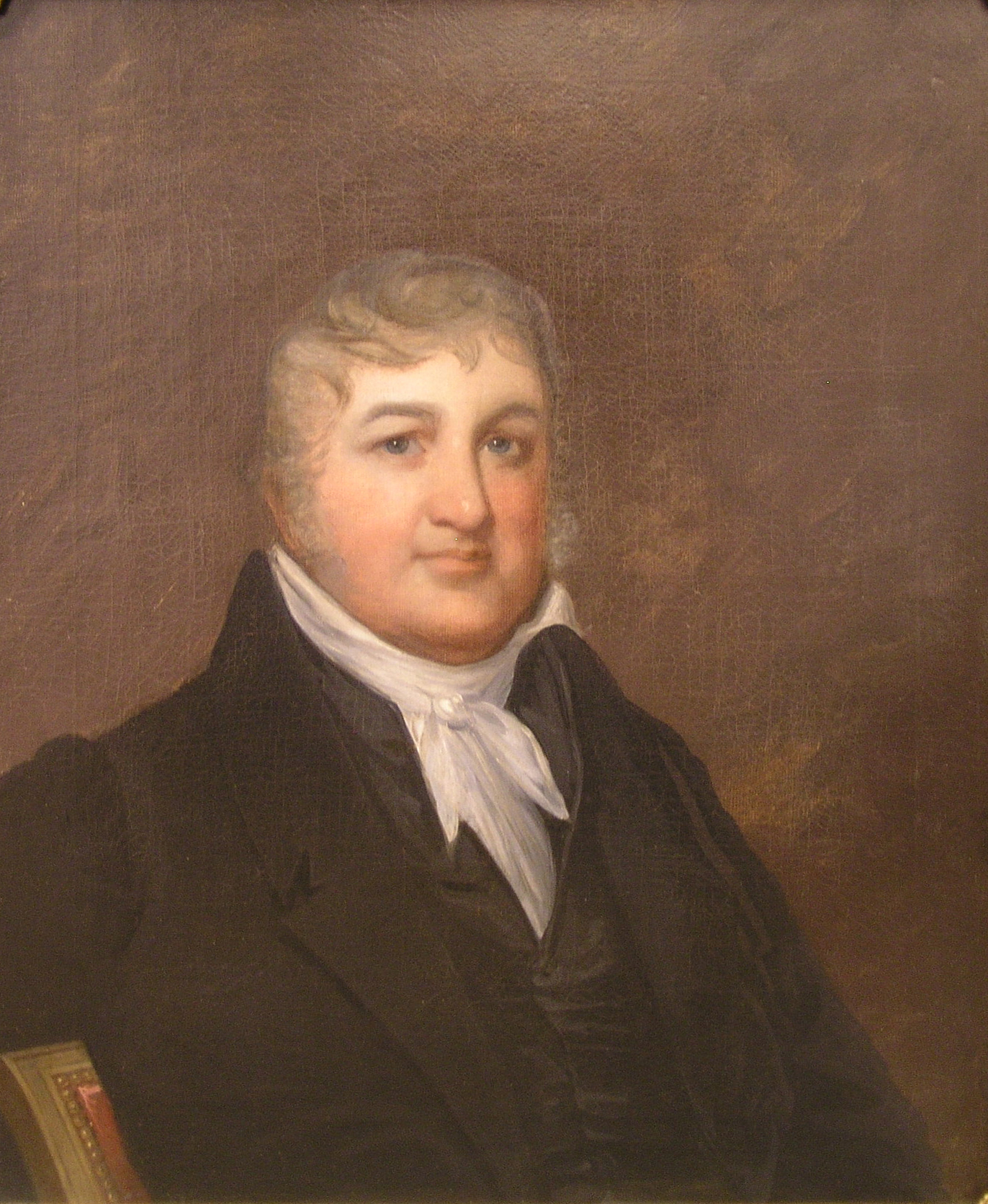

Presiding Judge of the Louisiana Supreme Court
- In office 1813–1836
- Preceded by: New position
- Succeeded by: Henry Carlton

Justice of the Superior Court of the Territory of Orleans
- In office 1806–1813
- Preceded by: Ephraim Kirby
- Succeeded by: Court abolished

Justice of the Superior Court of the Territory of Mississippi
- In office 1804–1806
- Preceded by: New position
- Succeeded by: Court abolished

Personal details
- Born: September 30, 1774 Augusta County, Virginia
- Died: November 14, 1836 (aged 62) St. Francisville, Louisiana
- Resting place: Grace Episcopal Church
- Spouse: Harriet Flowers
- Relations: George Mathews, father; Mathews family
- Education: Liberty Hall Academy Washington and Lee University
- Profession: Judge

George Mathews Jr. (September 30, 1774 – November 14, 1836), was a Judge of the Superior Courts of the Territory of Mississippi and the Territory of Orleans, and Presiding Judge of the Louisiana Supreme Court from 1813 until his death in 1836. His ruling in Marie Louise v. Marot was cited as precedent by dissenting U.S. Supreme Court Justice John McLean in the 1856 landmark Dred Scott v. Sandford case.

== Early life ==
Mathews was born in Augusta County, Virginia, on September 30, 1774, the son of a planter and Revolutionary War officer, George Mathews and his wife, Polly. The elder Mathews would later serve twice as Governor of Georgia. In 1785, the elder Mathews moved himself and his whole family to Wilkes County, Georgia, to land that today is in Oglethorpe County.

Mathews returned to Virginia for his education at Liberty Hall Academy (which later became Washington and Lee University). He originally set out to become a physician but was persuaded by his father to study law under his brother, John Mathews, in Augusta, Georgia. He married Harriet Flowers in 1809 and they resided near St. Francisville, Louisiana, at her family's Butler Greenwood Plantation.

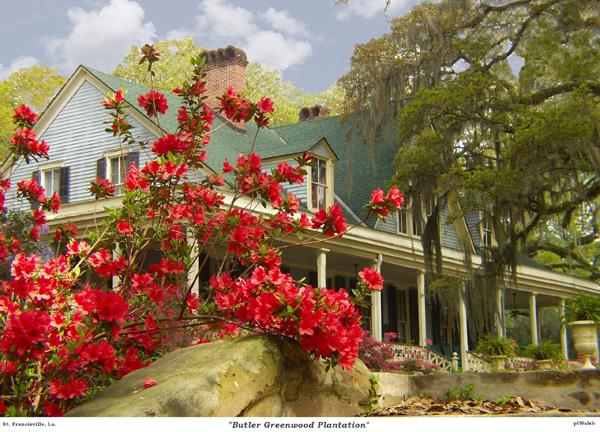
Butler Greenwood Plantation

George and Harriett Mathews raised indigo, cotton, sugar cane, and corn on the plantation, shipping the crops from their own dock on Bayou Sara and extending their land holdings to include a sugar plantation in Lafourche Parish that, according to Lewis Gray's figures, placed them among the top 9% of sugar planters in the state in the 1850s. The Mathews owned slaves, and used their labor on their plantation. In an 1826 report, George Mathews relayed in family correspondence that his slaves in the field were picking 126 pounds of cotton, each.

== Career on the bench ==
In 1804 Mathews was appointed by President Thomas Jefferson to be judge of the Superior Court of the newly created Territory of Mississippi. He served for two years on that court before being appointed judge of the Superior Court for the Territory of Orleans in 1806.

When Louisiana became a state in 1813, the territorial courts were replaced by a new Supreme Court. Mathews was appointed by Governor William C.C. Claiborne as judge of that new high court on February 23, 1813. He served alongside Judges Dominic Augustin Hall, Pierre Derbigny and Francois Xavier Martin. He reputedly learned both French and Spanish as much of the law of the State of Louisiana was rooted in the traditions of the land's previous colonial overlords and many lawyers spoke one of the two languages but not English.

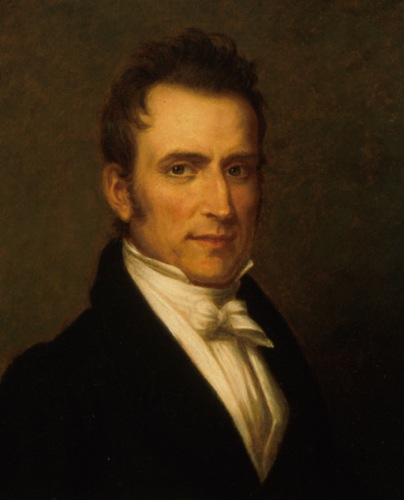
US Supreme Court Justice John McLean, who relied on Mathews' precedent for his dissent from the Court ruling in Dred Scott v. Sandford

=== Dred Scott v. Sandford precedent ===
In the early 1830s, a Louisiana family went to France with their young slave girl, Josephine Louise. When the family returned home, the slave girl's mother filed a freedom suit to obtain a declaration of immediate emancipation as a result of the girl being transported to a country that did not recognize the institution of slavery. The 1835 case, Marie Louise v. Marot (1836) was heard by the Louisiana state district court and appealed to the Louisiana Supreme Court. The Court held that a slave who is taken to a territory prohibitive of slavery cannot be again reduced to slavery on returning to a territory allowing of slavery. Mathews, speaking for the court, stated that "[b]eing free for one moment...it was not in the power of her former owner to reduce her again to slavery."

21 years later, his precedent was relied upon by US Supreme Court Justice John McLean, who dissented from the court's Dred Scott ruling that a slave was a piece of property that could by transported by his owner from a Southern state into a territory that forbade slavery without losing his slave status. Six of 8 justices did not abide by the precedent in what has been considered the worst decision ever made by the Supreme Court.

== Legacy and honors ==
Mathews died in St. Francisville on November 14, 1836. He left a very large fortune at his death, and his will was successfully attacked; one of its dispositions being annulled by the Louisiana Supreme Court.

The Louisiana Historical Association celebrated the Centenary of the Louisiana Supreme Court in 1922 and at that time Mathews was remembered as, "short, rotund, placid, even-tempered, and genial, with a touch of humor and pleasantry in his intercourse with men and on the bench. His disposition crops out in his opinions which, moreover, are fine specimens of taste and learning."

Mathews, Louisiana, is named in his honor.

== See also ==
- A Discourse on the Life and Character of the Hon. George Mathews

Legal offices
Preceded by newly created position	Judge of the Superior Court of the Territory of Mississippi; 1804–1806	Succeeded by unknown
Preceded by Ephraim Kirby	Judge of the Superior Court of the Territory of Orleans; 1806–1813	Succeeded by court abolished
Preceded by newly created position	Justice of the Louisiana Supreme Court; 1813–1836; Chief Justice 1821–1836	Succeeded by Henry Carlton
