= Marie Louise v. Marot =

1835 freedom suit in Louisiana

Marie Louise v. Toussaint Marot
- Court: Louisiana Supreme Court
- Decided: May 1, 1836
- Citation: 9 La. 473

Case history
- Prior action: 8 La. 475

Holding
- Judgment affirmed, with costs.

Case opinions
- Christopher Mathews

Keywords
- emancipation, slavery

Marie Louise v. Marot 9 La. 473 (1836) was a freedom suit heard by the Louisiana state district court and appealed to the Louisiana Supreme Court. It held that a slave who is taken to a territory that prohibits slavery cannot be again reduced to slavery on returning to a territory that allows slavery. The ruling was cited as precedent to the 1856 landmark Dred Scott v. Sandford case heard by the US Supreme Court. Supreme Court Justice John McLean cited the precedent in his dissent of the majority ruling. Seven of the nine justices did not abide by the precedent in what has been considered the worst decision ever made by the Supreme Court.

== Louisiana state district court ==
In 1835, Josephine Louise, a slave, was transported by the defendant Marot from Louisiana to France, a country in which slavery was not tolerated. Josephine's mother, Marie Louise, a freed black, argued on her daughter's return to Louisiana that her daughter had been subject to immediate emancipation on her arrival in France and could not be reduced again to slavery.

The case was tried in Louisiana state district court in June 1835. At trial, the evidence established the facts as alleged. The judge delivered instructions to the jury as follows:

That if the plaintiff's daughter, Josephine, was taken by the person claiming her services as a slave to a foreign country, where slavery does not exist, and is not tolerated, and by the laws of which such slave would be entitled to her liberty, for the purpose of residence, even temporarily, that is, for any other purpose than mere passage through such country, and perhaps even then, the person so taken to such country would become free, and that freedom once impressed upon an individual was indelible; and the status, or condition in society of such party could not be changed.

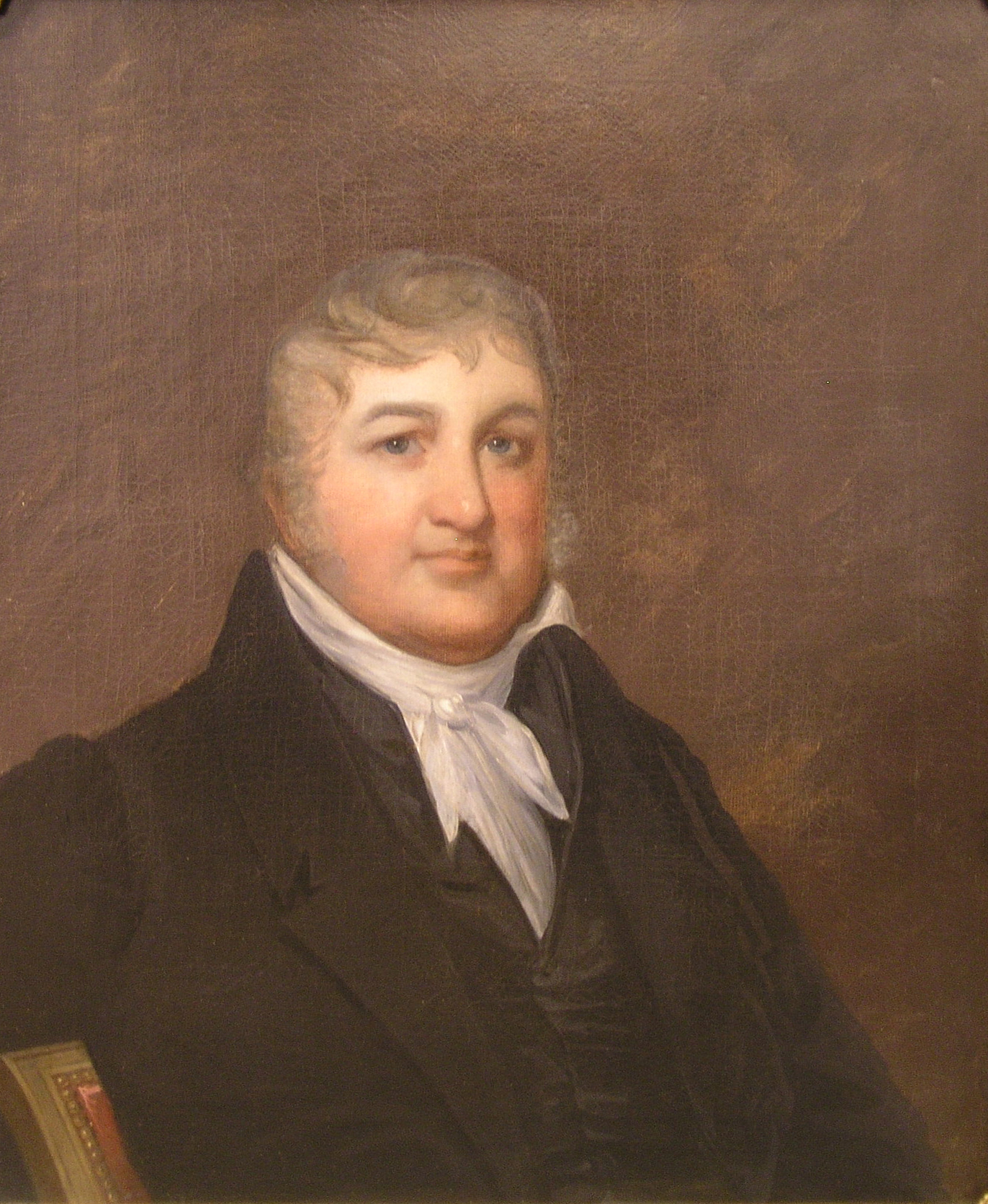
Presiding Judge of the Louisiana Supreme Court George Mathews, Jr.

It is for the jury to decide the fact, whether the plaintiff's daughter, Josephine, was taken to France on a mere passage through the country, or for the purpose of temporary residence. That in the opinion of the court, it makes no difference, that the donee or owner of the slave, as the defendant, was a minor at the time of the voyage to France, and could give no legal consent; because the condition of freedom was de facto impressed on the person held to service, so carried to a foreign country, without having run away or escaped...; but the right to personal freedom by such residence, in such foreign country, was acquired by, and stamped upon the person so previously held to such service, and such a person is entitled to freedom.

The jury returned a verdict that "Josephine is entitled to her freedom." The defendants appealed the case, which was heard by the Louisiana Supreme Court.

== Louisiana Supreme Court ==
The Louisiana Supreme Court heard the appeal in May 1836. The facts of the case were reviewed by the court. Presiding Judge George Mathews, Jr., writing for a unanimous court, affirmed the judgment of the district court in a single paragraph, holding that Josephine Louise was free and could not be re-enslaved:

This fact [concerning the nature of French law] was submitted to the consideration of the last jury, who tried the cause under a charge of the judge, which we consider to be correct, and was found in favor of the party whose liberty is claimed. Being free for one moment in France, it was not in the power of her former owner to reduce her again to slavery.

== Precedent to Dred Scott v. Sandford ==
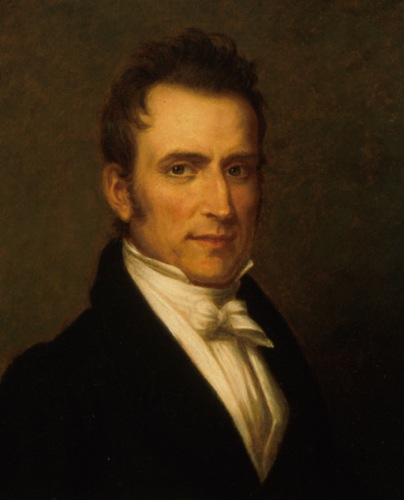
US Supreme Court Justice John McLean

The precedent was relied upon by US Supreme Court Justice John McLean 21 years later in the landmark decision of Dred Scott v. Sandford by the US Supreme Court. Justice McLean dissented from the court's decision that a slave was a piece of property that could be transported by his owner from a state into a territory that banned slavery without losing his slave status. He cited Marie Louise v. Marot as precedent. Seven of the nine justices did not abide by the precedent in what has been considered the worst decision ever made by the Supreme Court.
