= Butler Greenwood Plantation =

Historic house in Louisiana, United States

- Butler--Greenwood Plantation
- U.S. National Register of Historic Places
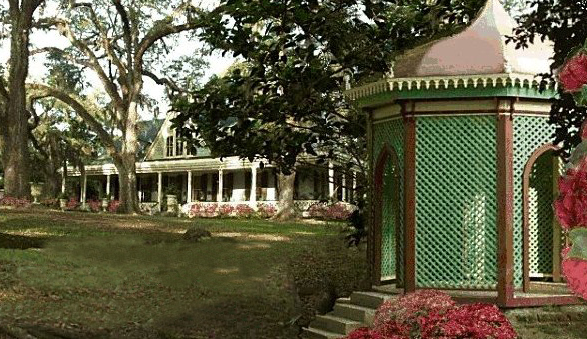
- Butler--Greenwood Plantation

- Location within Louisiana Location within the United States
- Nearest city: St. Francisville, Louisiana
- Coordinates: 30.8201°N 91.3903°W
- Area: 44 acres (18 ha)
- Built: 1810
- NRHP reference No.: 79001103
- Added to NRHP: April 17, 1979

The Butler Greenwood Plantation is a plantation in Louisiana. It is on U.S. Route 61, 2.2 kilometers (1.4 mi) to the north of St. Francisville, Louisiana. It is listed on the National Register of Historic Places.

== History ==
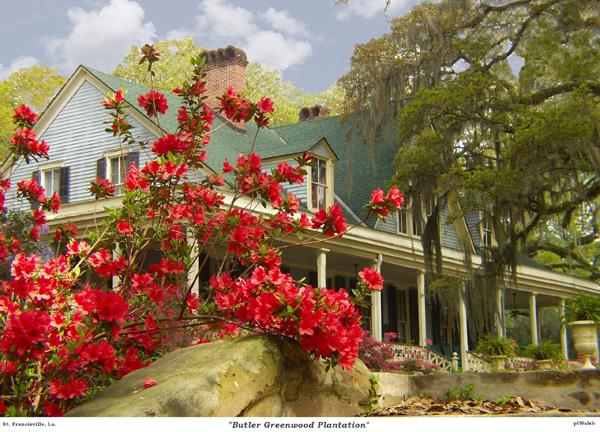
The plantation's gardens

The plantation was created by Dr. Samuel Flower, a Quaker physician who relocated from Pennsylvania during the 1770s when the area was British territory. Later, when Spain gained control (see St. Francisville, Louisiana, history), he gave medical treatment to Governor Manuel Gayoso.

When Dr. Flower died in 1813, the year after Louisiana became a state, his eight heirs would divide thousands of arpents of land in the Felicianas, Rapides Parish, along Bayou Manchac, and in the Mississippi Territory. The family residence bordering Bayou Sara, appraised in the estate division at $12,300, was left to Dr. Flower's 20-year-old married daughter Harriett.

Harriett Flower's husband, Judge George Mathews, was a superior court judge in the Mississippi Territory and then in the Territory of Orleans, appointed by President Thomas Jefferson. He became the chief justice of the Louisiana Supreme Court after statehood. His father, General George Mathews, was an American Revolutionary War hero who survived being stabbed several times to become a US Congressman, military general, and two-term Governor of Georgia.

Harriett and Judge George Mathews lived at Butler Greenwood and used the forced labor of enslaved people to grow indigo, cotton, sugarcane, and corn, shipping the crops from their dock on Bayou Sara and extending their landholdings to include a productive sugar plantation in Lafourche Parish that, according to Lewis Gray's figures, placed them among the top-producing 9% of sugar planters in the state in the 1850s. After the death of Judge Mathews in 1836, his widow continued to run the plantations with help from her son Charles Lewis Mathews.

In the census of 1860, both Harriett and her son list their occupations as a planter, their household including Charles’ wife Penelope Stewart, their children, an Austrian music teacher, and an Irish gardener, with 96 slaves living in 18 dwellings and their estate valued at $260,000 (~$7.38 million in 2024). In that year the 1,400 acres (5.7 km^{2}) of Butler Greenwood Plantation produced 130 bales of cotton, 2000 bushels of corn, 175 hogsheads of sugar, and more than 10,000 gallons of molasses. Their other plantations covered nearly 10,000 acres (40 km^{2}) worked by some 400 slaves and were equally productive in 1860. However, after the Civil War the labor force had fallen to a field gang of only 27 freedmen working for monthly wages in the home place.

== Today ==
Now the home of the seventh and eighth generation of the family, author Anne Butler and her daughter Chase Poindexter, Butler Greenwood is a simple, raised cottage-style plantation house filled with oil portraits, Brussels carpet, gilded pier mirrors, Mallard poster beds, fine china and silverware, a French Pleyel grand piano, and the area's finest original Victorian formal parlor, its twelve matching pieces still in their original upholstery. The house is surrounded by formal gardens and extensive groves of live oak trees, the original detached brick kitchen dates from the 1790s, the garden gazebo from the 1850s.

Butler Greenwood Plantation is open for house tours and overnight stays in bed and breakfast cottages on the plantation grounds.
