= Ridgeville, Ohio =

Unincorporated community in Ohio, US

Coordinates: 39°31′43″N 84°10′37″W

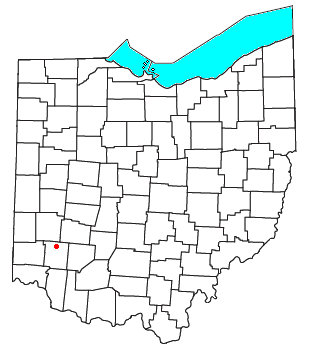
Location of Ridgeville, Ohio

Ridgeville is an unincorporated community in central Clearcreek Township, Warren County, Ohio, United States. It is located on State Route 48 in the north central part of the county, in sections 30 and 36, T4R4, Between the Miami Rivers Survey.

Ridgeville was platted in 1814 by Fergus McLean, the father of John McLean, afterward a United States Supreme Court Justice. A post office called Ridgeville was established in 1815, and remained in operation until 1908.
