= John McLean =

American jurist and politician (1785–1861)

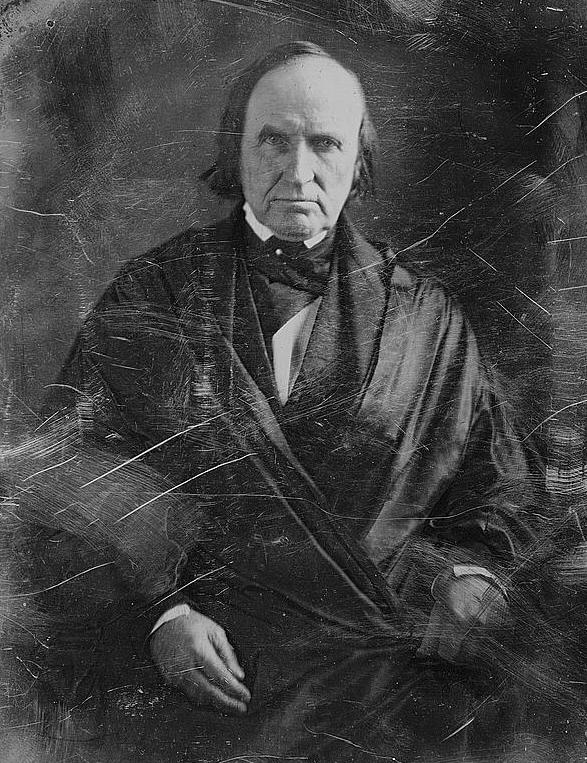
- Daguerreotype by Mathew Brady, c. 1849

Associate Justice of the Supreme Court of the United States
- In office March 12, 1829 – April 4, 1861
- Nominated by: Andrew Jackson
- Preceded by: Robert Trimble
- Succeeded by: Noah Swayne

9th United States Postmaster General
- In office June 26, 1823 – March 4, 1829
- President: James Monroe; John Quincy Adams
- Preceded by: Return Meigs
- Succeeded by: William Barry

Commissioner of the General Land Office
- In office September 11, 1822 – June 26, 1823
- President: James Monroe
- Preceded by: Josiah Meigs
- Succeeded by: George Graham

Associate Justice of the Ohio Supreme Court
- In office February 17, 1816 – September 11, 1822
- Preceded by: William Irvin
- Succeeded by: Charles Sherman

Member of the U.S. House of Representatives from Ohio's 1st district
- In office March 4, 1813 – October 8, 1816
- Preceded by: Jeremiah Morrow
- Succeeded by: William Henry Harrison

Personal details
- Born: March 11, 1785 Morris County, New Jersey, U.S.
- Died: April 4, 1861 (aged 76) Cincinnati, Ohio, U.S.
- Party: Democratic-Republican (before 1825); National Republican (1825–1828); Democratic (1828–1831); Anti-Masonic (1831–1838); Whig (1838–1848); Free Soil (1848–1854); Republican (1854–1861)
- Other political affiliations: Jacksonian
- Spouses: Rebecca Edwards (m. 1807; died 1841) Sarah Ludlow (m. 1843)
- Children: 6
- Education: Harvard University

John McLean (March 11, 1785 – April 4, 1861) was an American jurist and politician who served in the United States Congress, as U.S. Postmaster General, and as a justice of the Ohio and United States Supreme Courts. He was often discussed for the Whig Party nominations for president, and is also one of the few people who served in all three branches of government.

Born in New Jersey, McLean lived in several frontier towns before settling in Ridgeville, Ohio. He founded The Western Star, a weekly newspaper, and established a law practice. He won election to the United States House of Representatives, serving from 1813 until his election to the Ohio Supreme Court in 1816. He resigned from that position to accept appointment to the administration of President James Monroe, becoming the U.S. postmaster general in 1823. Under Monroe and President John Quincy Adams, McLean presided over a major expansion of the United States Post Office Department. In 1829, President Andrew Jackson appointed McLean as an associate justice of the United States Supreme Court.

On the court, McLean became known as an opponent of slavery, and he was frequently mentioned as a presidential candidate for various parties. McLean received the support of delegates at the 1848 Whig National Convention, the 1856 Republican National Convention, and the 1860 Republican National Convention. He was the sole dissenter in the fugitive slave case of Prigg v. Pennsylvania and one of two justices to dissent in the landmark case of Dred Scott v. Sandford. McLean served on the court until his death in 1861.

== Early years ==
McLean was born in Morris County, New Jersey, the son of Fergus McLean and Sophia Blackford. After living in a succession of frontier towns, namely Morgantown, Virginia, Nicholasville, Kentucky, and Maysville, Kentucky, his family settled in Ridgeville, Warren County, Ohio, in 1797. There, McLean received his formal education and developed his interest in law, later graduating from Harvard in 1806. It can be argued that his anti-slavery views also began to form at this time, given his upbringing as an evangelical Methodist with a focus on egalitarianism. His brother William was also a successful Ohio politician.

McLean studied law and was admitted to the bar in 1807. That same year, he founded The Western Star, a weekly newspaper at Lebanon, the Warren County seat. In 1810, Mclean transferred ownership of the Star to his brother Nathaniel and hung up his shingle, beginning to practice law as an individual lawyer for the first time. He was elected to the U.S. House for the Thirteenth and Fourteenth Congresses, serving from March 4, 1813, until he resigned in 1816 to take a seat on the Ohio Supreme Court, to which he had been elected on February 17, 1816, replacing William W. Irvin.

== The State of Ohio v. Thomas D. Carneal ==
State v. Carneal, which occurred during McLean's tenure on the Ohio Supreme Court, foreshadowed McLean's future dissent in an important fugitive slavery case, Dred Scott v. Sandford (1857). In it, a black man named Richard Lunsford, a Kentucky slave, applied for a writ of habeas corpus to obtain freedom from his owner, Thomas D. Carneal. The Ohio Constitution of 1802 forbade slavery in the state, and at issue was whether slaves owned by a man traveling in Ohio became free once they traveled to Ohio and whether a slave who resided in Kentucky could be sent to work in Ohio without gaining his freedom. Lunsford, as a slave who was regularly sent to work in Ohio, sued on the grounds that, by having him travel to work in Cincinnati for periods of over a week, Thomas Carneal forfeited his property rights in Lunsford. The Court ruled, with McLean issuing its opinion, that since Carneal sold Lunsford to a Mr. James Riddle, the man who sent Lunsford to Cincinnati, he did in fact forfeit his right to be Lunsford's owner. The most notable portion of this case was McLean's opinion, which highlighted his personal distaste for the institution of slavery: "Were it proper to consider it, the Court, as well as from the principles recognized by our Constitution and Laws, could not hesitate in declaring that SLAVERY [emphasis in original], except for the punishment of crimes, is an infringement upon the sacred rights of man: Rights, which he derives from his Creator, and which are inalienable."

== Executive branch service ==
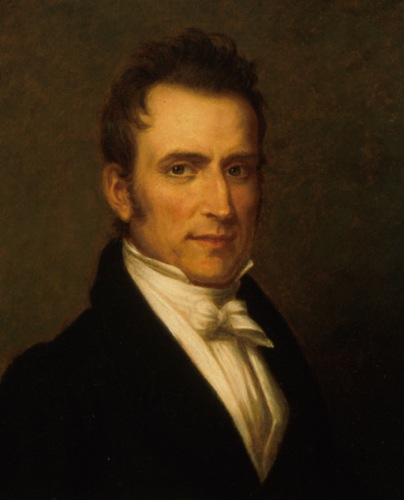
Portrait of John McLean

He resigned his judgeship in 1822 to take President James Monroe's appointment to be Commissioner of the United States General Land Office, serving until 1823, when Monroe appointed him United States Postmaster General. McLean served in that post from December 9, 1823, to March 7, 1829, under Monroe and John Quincy Adams, presiding over a massive expansion of the Post Office into the new western states and territories and the elevation of the Postmaster Generalship to a cabinet office.

During Adams' administration McLean supported Vice President John C. Calhoun, who was estranged from the president, but Adams declined to remove McLean despite Secretary of State Henry Clay asking for his removal.

== Supreme Court appointment and tenure ==
While Postmaster General, McLean supported Andrew Jackson, who offered him the posts of Secretary of War and Secretary of the Navy. McLean declined both and was instead appointed to the Supreme Court by Jackson on March 6, 1829, to a seat vacated by Robert Trimble. McLean was confirmed by the United States Senate on March 7, 1829, receiving his commission the same day. He was sworn into office on March 12.

Known as "The Politician on the Supreme Court," he associated himself with every party on the political spectrum, moving from a Jacksonian Democrat, to the Anti-Jackson Democrats, the Anti-Masonic Party, the Whigs, the Free Soilers, and finally the Republicans. For this reason he has been characterized as a "political opportunist" whose political affiliations varied. McLean was touted as a potential Whig presidential candidate throughout the 1830s-40s. President John Tyler offered him the post of Secretary of War, but he declined. Because of his anti-slavery-extension positions, he was considered by the new Republican party as a presidential candidate in 1856, but the nomination went to John C. Frémont. McLean sought the presidency again in 1860 despite turning 75 that March. He won twelve votes on the first ballot at the Republican convention; Abraham Lincoln ultimately was nominated.

=== Groves v. Slaughter ===
McLean's tendency toward economic nationalism can be seen in cases such as Groves v. Slaughter, 40 U.S. 449 (1841). In this case, McLean upheld the right of Mississippi to restrict the introduction of slaves from other states. Though it was "not necessary" to the decision, McLean restated his nationalism by holding that the power to regulate commerce rested exclusively with Congress. "The necessity of a uniform commercial regulation, more than any other consideration, led to the adoption of the federal Constitution. And unless the power be not only paramount, but exclusive, the Constitution must fail to attain one of the principal objects of its formation," McLean wrote.

Groves v. Slaughter concerned a Mississippi man who had bought some slaves but believed that he could escape without paying the slave-trader due to a clause in the Mississippi constitution that seemed to forbid the importation of slaves for in-state sale after a certain date. For the Court, the issue became whether Congress possessed an exclusive right to regulate interstate commerce. If so, did it follow that states could not constitutionally regulate the slave trade? Moreover, should the Court answer in the affirmative, on what basis could a state abolish slavery? McLean, seeking to limit national regulation in regards to slavery, paradoxically abandoned his aforementioned position as an economic nationalist when he claimed, "The power over slavery belongs to the States respectively. It is local in its character and in its effects." This was of course done in accordance with the Free Soil fear that, if the states lost their power to regulate slavery, what was to stop its spread into the free North? McLean held that the States should be given the right to protect themselves from the "avarice and intrusion of the slave dealer." All of this he contended while holding the aforementioned view, which demonstrates his tortured reconciliation of two neo-Federalist political biases, which in this case contradict: one favoring an expansive national government, the other condemning slavery.

=== Prigg v. Pennsylvania ===
In Prigg v. Pennsylvania (1842), McLean dissented. By his reasoning, it was necessary for Prigg to take Morgan to court to demonstrate that she was, in fact, a slave. As such Prigg did not have the legal pretext to remove Morgan from the state of Pennsylvania, without first gaining judicial approval. A court had to decide that Morgan was technically a slave for Prigg to have the authority to transport her across state lines. McLean suggests that this process was the only way to be fair to the slave, the owner, the free state, and the slaveholding state from which the slave came, stating that "[his] opinion, therefore, does not rest so much upon the particular law of Pennsylvania, as upon the inherent and sovereign power of a state, to protect its jurisdiction and the peace of its citizens, in any and every mode which its discretion shall dictate, which shall not conflict with a defined power of the federal government."

=== Passenger Cases ===
McLean's sense of nationalism could be seen again in his concurring opinion on the Passenger Cases (1849). The most senior member of the Court at the time, McLean began his opinion by weighing in on the debate concerning the nature of the Commerce Clause. McLean asserted the Commerce Clause "is exclusively vested in Congress." Under this view, if the federal government does not regulate a particular area of foreign or interstate commerce, it means that federal policy maintains that such an area should remain unregulated, not that states should have the right to impose individual regulations. To McLean, only one authority could exercise any given power, and the judicial task was to determine whether a particular subject fell within a power delegated to the federal government or within a power reserved to the States. McLean denied that the States could exercise a power unless the federal government chose to exercise the same power, at which point state regulation would be trumped by federal action. Although McLean recognized that both Congress and the States could impose a tax on the same object, he insisted these respective taxes result from the exercise of distinct powers, and did not represent any concurrent exercise of the same power.

=== Dred Scott v. Sandford ===
In Dred Scott v. Sandford (1857), he was one of two dissenting Justices to the majority vote, the other being Justice Benjamin Robbins Curtis. Justice McLean cited Marie Louise v. Marot, an 1835 freedom suit appealed to the Louisiana Supreme Court in which Presiding Judge George Mathews, Jr. stated that "[b]eing free for one moment...it was not in the power of [the plaintiff's] former owner to reduce her again to slavery." In opposition to the majority ruling that African-Americans cannot and were not intended to be citizens under the US Constitution, McLean argued that they had already the right to vote in five states. His strong dissenting views are believed to have forced the hand of Chief Justice Roger Brooke Taney into a harsher and more polarizing opinion than he originally planned. To the argument that "a colored citizen would not be an agreeable member of society," McLean responded, "This is more a matter of taste than of law."

=== Wheaton v. Peters ===
He also wrote the Court's opinion denying there was a common-law copyright in American law in Wheaton v. Peters.

== Societies ==
During the 1820s, McLean was a member of the prestigious Columbian Institute for the Promotion of Arts and Sciences, who counted among their members former presidents Andrew Jackson and John Quincy Adams and many prominent men of the day, including well-known representatives of the military, government service, medical and other professions.

== Death and legacy ==
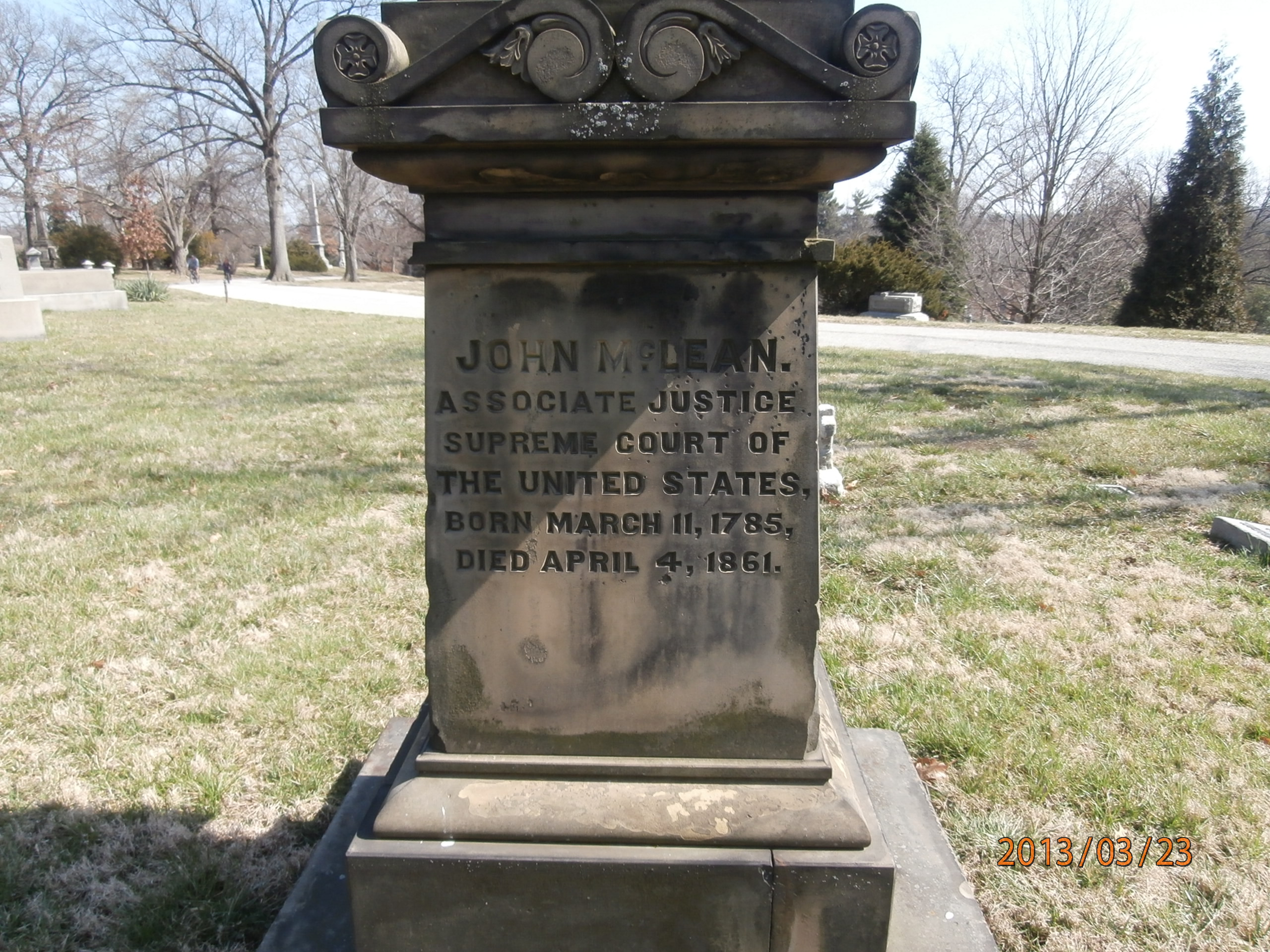
John McLean grave at Spring Grove Cemetery, Cincinnati OH

McLean became the last surviving member of the Monroe and Quincy Adams Cabinets. He died in Cincinnati, Ohio, and was buried in Spring Grove Cemetery there. Also interred there is Stanley Matthews, another associate justice, as well as chief justice Salmon P. Chase.

During the American Civil War, Camp John McLean, a Union Army training camp in Cincinnati, was named in his honor. McLean's daughter Evelyn McLean married Joseph Pannell Taylor, brother of U.S. President Zachary Taylor and uncle of Jefferson Davis by marriage. His son, Nathaniel C. McLean (1815–1905), a Cincinnati native, was a Union general in the American Civil War. Nathaniel's daughter Evelyn was the wife of army general Charles H. Whipple.

== See also ==
- Abraham Lincoln's patent
- List of justices of the Supreme Court of the United States
- List of United States Supreme Court justices by time in office
- United States Supreme Court cases during the Marshall Court
- United States Supreme Court cases during the Taney Court
- List of United States federal judges by longevity of service

== Notes ==
- Thomas E. Carney. "The Political Judge: Justice John McLean Pursuit of the Presidency. Ohio History. v. 111. Summer/Autumn 2002. 121+
- Francis Phelphs Weisenberger. The Life of John McLean, A Politician On the United States Supreme Court. Columbus, Ohio: The Ohio State University Press, 1937
- United States Congress. "John McLean (id: M000549)". Biographical Directory of the United States Congress.

== Works cited ==
- Howe, Daniel (2007). What Hath God Wrought: The Transformation of America, 1815–1848. Oxford University Press. ISBN 978-0-19-507894-7.

U.S. House of Representatives
New constituency	Member of the U.S. House of Representatives from Ohio's 1st congressional district 1813–1816	Succeeded by William Henry Harrison
Preceded by Nicholas Moore	Chair of the House Accounts Committee; 1815–1816	Succeeded by Peter Little
Legal offices
Preceded by William Irvin	Associate Justice of the Ohio Supreme Court; 1816–1822	Succeeded by Charles Sherman
Preceded by Robert Trimble	Associate Justice of the Supreme Court of the United States; 1829–1861	Succeeded by Noah Swayne
Political offices
Preceded by Josiah Meigs	Commissioner of the General Land Office; 1822–1823	Succeeded by George Graham
Preceded by Return Meigs	United States Postmaster General; 1823–1829	Succeeded by William Barry
