= Groves v. Slaughter =

- Supreme Court of the United States

Decided March 10, 1841
- Full case name: Groves v. Slaughter
- Citations: 40 U.S. 449 (more)

Holding
- A seller of imported slaves was able to collect on a defaulted note because the Mississippi's constitutional provision allowing its legislature to prevent slaves from being brought into the state for sale was not self-executing.

Court membership
- Chief Justice Roger B. Taney Associate Justices Joseph Story · Smith Thompson; John McLean · Henry Baldwin; James M. Wayne · John Catron; John McKinley

Case opinions
- Plurality: Thompson, joined by Wayne
- Concurrence: Taney (in judgment)
- Concurrence: McLean (in judgment)
- Concurrence: Balwin (in judgment)
- Dissent: Story, joined by McKinley

Groves v. Slaughter, 40 U.S. (15 Pet.) 449 (1841), was a decision of the United States Supreme Court.

== Supreme Court ==
The Supreme Court decided the case on March 10, 1841, by a 5–2 vote. Justice Smith Thompson wrote only for himself and Justice James M. Wayne. The remaining three justices wrote separately and concurred only in the result.

The Court ruled that a seller of imported slaves should be able to collect on a defaulted note because the state constitutional provision was not self-executing. Since 1817, the state constitution of Mississippi had permitted the legislature to prevent slaves from being brought into the state for sale. The Court decided that the execution of the constitutional provision still required legislative enactments to "carry it into full operation" even after the constitution of 1832 set a specific date for the provision to "take effect:" "Legislative provision is indispensable to carry into effect the object of this prohibition".

=== Concurrences ===
By deciding that the state constitutional provision was not self-executing, the Court avoided the question of whether the state police power infringed upon the federal commerce clause. Even so, several concurrences of note were written about the Commerce Clause.

Based on the opinion of Chief Justice John Marshall in Gibbons v. Ogden, Justice John McLean stated that "the necessity of a uniform commercial regulation, more than any other consideration, led to the adoption of the federal Constitution."

McLean wrote that only Mississippi can decide to prohibit the importation of slaves into Mississippi from other states. McLean explains that while states may not "establish a non-intercourse with the other states" existing prohibitions on slavery were a legitimate exercise of state power because the power over slavery "is local in its character and in its effects." Each state "has a right" to protect itself and to guard its citizens from immorality and dangers by abolishing slavery:

The right to exercise this power, by a state, is higher and deeper than the Constitution. The evil involves the prosperity, and may endanger the existence of a state. Its power to guard against, or to remedy the evil, rests upon the law of self-preservation

Chief Justice Roger B. Taney wrote to state his opinion that the power over slavery was not within any of the powers conferred by the federal Constitution to the federal government, including the commerce power. Considering the Commerce Clause as a separate matter, he wrote that no case had yet decided if the commerce power was exclusive, but Congress had the right to "abrogate and annul any and every regulation of commerce made by a state." Justice Henry Baldwin wrote separately objecting to the concurrences by McLean and Taney. Baldwin wrote that "any regulation which affects the commercial intercourse between any two or more states...is within the powers granted exclusively to Congress...." He added:

That I may stand alone among the members of this Court, does not deter me from declaring that I feel bound to consider slaves as property, by the law of the states before the adoption of the Constitution, and from the first settlement of the colonies; that this right of property exists independently of the Constitution, which does not create, but recognises and protects it from violation, by any law or regulation of any state, in the cases to which the Constitution applies.

Baldwin wrote that the right to collect on the defaulted note would be protected under the federal constitution even if it was not protected by the state constitution of Mississippi. The state constitution could restrict the importation of slaves under its police power for welfare and safety reasons but not the importation of slaves for sale when slavery was permitted in general.

=== Dissents ===
Justices Joseph Story and John McKinley dissented.

== Scholarship ==
Paul Finkelman wrote that by seeking to protect "the rights of masters who might travel to free states," Baldwin's argument that slaves are property, not people, under the federal constitution was more "shrewd and realistic" than Taney's argument rejecting congressional authority.

Mary Sarah Bilder wrote that Baldwin's purpose for making those arguments was "oblique."

== Sources ==
- Bilder, Mary Sarah (1996). "The Struggle Over Immigration: Indentured Servants, Slaves and Articles of Commerce". Missouri Law Review. 61 (4).
- Finkelman, Paul (1981). An Imperfect Union: Slavery, Federalism, and Comity. Chapel Hill: University of North Carolina Press. ISBN 0-8078-4066-1.
- Eastman, John C.; Jaffa, Harry V. (1996). "Review: Understanding Justice Sutherland As He Understood Himself". The University of Chicago Law Review. 63 (3). doi:10.2307/1600257. JSTOR 1600257.
