= Sovereign immunity in the United States =

Legal protection of federal, state and tribal governments

In United States law, the federal government as well as state and tribal governments generally enjoy sovereign immunity, also known as governmental immunity, from lawsuits. Local governments in most jurisdictions enjoy immunity from some forms of suit, particularly in tort. The Foreign Sovereign Immunities Act provides foreign governments, including state-owned companies, with a related form of immunity—state immunity—that shields them from lawsuits except in relation to certain actions relating to commercial activity in the United States. The principle of sovereign immunity in US law was inherited from the English common law legal maxim rex non potest peccare, meaning "the king can do no wrong." In some situations, sovereign immunity may be waived by law.

Sovereign immunity falls into two categories:

- Absolute immunity: When absolute immunity applies, a government actor may not be sued for the allegedly wrongful act, even if that person acted maliciously or in bad faith; and
- Qualified immunity: When qualified immunity applies, the government actor is shielded from liability only if specific conditions are met, as specified in statute or case law.

Absolute immunity applies to acts that, if subject to challenge, would significantly affect the operation of government, such as would occur if a legislator could be sued for core legislative acts, and is also typically extended to statements made on the floor of the legislature. Similar protections apply to judges who are acting in a judicial capacity.

== Federal sovereign immunity ==
In the United States, the federal government has sovereign immunity and may not be sued unless it has waived its immunity or consented to suit. The United States as a sovereign is immune from suit unless it unequivocally consents to being sued. The United States Supreme Court in Price v. United States observed: "It is an axiom of our jurisprudence. The government is not liable to suit unless it consents thereto, and its liability in suit cannot be extended beyond the plain language of the statute authorizing it."

The principle was not mentioned in the original United States Constitution. The courts have recognized it both as a principle that was inherited from English common law, and as a practical, logical inference (that the government cannot be compelled by the courts because it is the power of the government that creates the courts in the first place).

The United States has waived sovereign immunity to a limited extent, mainly through the Federal Tort Claims Act, which waives the immunity if a tortious act of a federal employee causes damage, and the Tucker Act, which waives the immunity over claims arising out of contracts to which the federal government is a party. The Federal Tort Claims Act and the Tucker Act are not the broad waivers of sovereign immunity they might appear to be, as there are a number of statutory exceptions and judicially fashioned limiting doctrines applicable to both. Title 28 U.S.C. § 1331 confers federal question jurisdiction on district courts, but this statute has been held not to be a blanket waiver of sovereign immunity on the part of the federal government.

In federal tax refund cases filed by taxpayers (as opposed to third parties) against the United States, various courts have indicated that federal sovereign immunity is waived under subsection (a)(1) of 28 U.S.C. § 1346 in conjunction with Internal Revenue Code section 7422 (26 U.S.C. § 7422), or under section 7422 in conjunction with subsection (a) of Internal Revenue Code section 6532 (26 U.S.C. § 6532). Further, in United States v. Williams, the U.S. Supreme Court held that in a case where an individual paid a federal tax under protest to remove a federal tax lien on her property where the tax she paid had been assessed against a third party, the waiver of sovereign immunity found in 28 U.S.C. § 1346(a)(1) authorized her tax refund suit.

Congress has also waived sovereign immunity for patent infringement claims under 28 U.S.C. § 1498(a), but that statute balances this waiver with provisions that limit the remedies available to the patent holder. The government may not be enjoined from infringing a patent, and persons performing work for the government are immune both from liability and from injunction. Any recourse must be sought only against the government in the United States Court of Federal Claims. In Advanced Software Design v. Federal Reserve Bank of St. Louis, the Federal Circuit expanded the interpretation of this protection to extend to private companies doing work not as contractors, but in which the government participates even indirectly.

Section 702 of the Administrative Procedure Act provides a broad waiver of sovereign immunity for actions taken by administrative agencies. It provides that persons suffering a legal wrong because of an agency action are entitled to judicial review.

== State sovereign immunity in federal courts ==
=== Early history and Eleventh Amendment ===
In 1793, the Supreme Court held in Chisholm v. Georgia that Article III, § 2 of the United States Constitution, which granted diversity jurisdiction to the federal courts, allowed lawsuits "between a State and Citizens of another State" as the text reads. In 1795, the Eleventh Amendment was ratified in response to this ruling, removing federal judicial jurisdiction from lawsuits "prosecuted against one of the United States by Citizens of another State, or by Citizens or Subjects of any Foreign State". The validity and retroactivity of the Eleventh Amendment was affirmed in the 1798 case Hollingsworth v. Virginia.

=== Later interpretation ===
In Hans v. Louisiana, the Supreme Court of the United States held that the Eleventh Amendment re-affirms that states possess sovereign immunity and are therefore immune from being sued in federal court without their consent. In later cases, the Supreme Court has strengthened state sovereign immunity considerably. In Blatchford v. Native Village of Noatak, the court explained that

we have understood the Eleventh Amendment to stand not so much for what it says, but for the presupposition of our constitutional structure which it confirms: that the States entered the federal system with their sovereignty intact; that the judicial authority in Article III is limited by this sovereignty, and that a State will therefore not be subject to suit in federal court unless it has consented to suit, either expressly or in the "plan of the convention." States may consent to suit, and therefore waive their Eleventh Amendment immunity by removing a case from state court to federal court. See Lapides v. Board of Regents of University System of Georgia.

(Citations omitted). In Alden v. Maine, the Court explained that while it has

sometimes referred to the States’ immunity from suit as "Eleventh Amendment immunity[,]" [that] phrase is [a] convenient shorthand but something of a misnomer, [because] the sovereign immunity of the States neither derives from nor is limited by the terms of the Eleventh Amendment. Rather, as the Constitution's structure, and its history, and the authoritative interpretations by this Court make clear, the States’ immunity from suit is a fundamental aspect of the sovereignty which the States enjoyed before the ratification of the Constitution, and which they retain today (either literally or by virtue of their admission into the Union upon an equal footing with the other States) except as altered by the plan of the Convention or certain constitutional Amendments.

Writing for the court in Alden, Justice Anthony Kennedy argued that in view of this, and given the limited nature of congressional power delegated by the original unamended Constitution, the court could not "conclude that the specific Article I powers delegated to Congress necessarily include, by virtue of the Necessary and Proper Clause or otherwise, the incidental authority to subject the States to private suits as a means of achieving objectives otherwise within the scope of the enumerated powers." Sovereign immunity as interpreted by the Supreme Court in Alden v. Maine means a constitutional prohibition of suits against states by its own citizens in state courts and federal courts.

However, a "consequence of [the] Court's recognition of pre-ratification sovereignty as the source of immunity from suit is that only States and arms of the State possess immunity from suits authorized by federal law." Northern Ins. Co. of N. Y. v. Chatham County (emphases added). Thus, cities and municipalities lack sovereign immunity, Jinks v. Richland County, and counties are not generally considered to have sovereign immunity, even when they "exercise a 'slice of state power.'" Lake Country Estates, Inc. v. Tahoe Regional Planning Agency.

Separately, sovereign immunity of a state from lawsuits in other states have been in question. The Supreme Court ruled in Nevada v. Hall (1977) that states are not constitutionally immune from being named in lawsuits filed in other states. In the intervening years, many states developed legislation that recognize sovereign immunity of other states; since 1979, there had only been 14 legal cases that did involve a state being named as a litigant in a case heard in another state. The Supreme Court overturned Nevada in its 2019 decision of Franchise Tax Board of California v. Hyatt (Docket 17-1299) that states did enjoy constitutional sovereign immunity from lawsuits in other states.

In Torres v. Texas Department of Public Safety (2022), the Court ruled 5–4 that Texas was not immune from a lawsuit filed by a returning veteran under the Uniformed Services Employment and Re-employment Rights Act of 1994, which was passed to ensure enlisted personnel would be able to return to their same job or one of similar pay and placement. Texas had argued that they could not be sued under a federal law due to state sovereign immunity, but the majority found that in matters related to the nation's defense, states had given up their sovereign immunity as part of joining the union.

=== State statutory waiver of sovereign immunity ===
After the federal government enacted the Federal Tort Claims Act in 1946, most (but not all) states have enacted limited statutory waivers of sovereign immunity in the form of state claims acts or state tort claims acts. These laws allow plaintiffs to bring lawsuits against the state and/or its subordinate entities, but often impose various procedural prerequisites or require plaintiffs to pursue their claims in a court that specializes in hearing claims against the state government. Such laws often cap the total amount of recoverable damages and prohibit awards of certain types of damages such as punitive damages. They also authorize affirmative defenses like discretionary immunity.

== State sovereign immunity in state courts ==
=== State actions in violation of the federal or state constitutions ===
State sovereign immunity in cases where a plaintiff alleges the state's action is in violation of the federal or state constitutions varies by State.

In Department of Revenue v. Kuhnlein, the Florida Department of Revenue claimed that sovereign immunity prevented plaintiffs from bringing a case that alleged that a tax violated the Commerce Clause and, furthermore, that if the tax was unconstitutional, the refund request could not be given because it did not comply with state statutes for tax refunds. The Florida Supreme Court rejected those arguments, stating: "Sovereign immunity does not exempt the State from a challenge based on violation of the federal or state constitutions, because any other rule self-evidently would make constitutional law subservient to the State's will. Moreover, neither the common law nor a state statute can supersede a provision of the federal or state constitutions."

=== State statutory waiver of sovereign immunity ===
In the 1961 Muskopf v. Corning Hospital District decision, the California Supreme Court decided that "total governmental immunity […] does not exist" and would no longer protect the state and other public entities from civil liability for their torts. The California Government Claims Act was enacted as a result.

== Other Sovereigns ==
=== Tribal sovereign immunity ===
The federal government recognizes tribal nations as "domestic dependent nations" and has established a number of laws attempting to clarify the relationship between the federal, state, and tribal governments. Generally speaking, Native American tribes enjoy immunity from suit—in federal, state, or tribal courts—unless they consent to suit, or unless the federal government abrogates that immunity. However, individual members of the tribe are not immune. Under certain circumstances, a tribal official acting in his or her official capacity, and within the scope of his or her statutory authority, may be cloaked with sovereign immunity. But if a tribal official's tortious acts exceed the scope of his or her authority, the official is subject to suit for those acts. See Cosentino vs. Fuller, Cal. Ct. App. (May 28, 2015).

=== Foreign sovereign immunity in state and federal courts ===
The Foreign Sovereign Immunities Act (FSIA) of 1976 establishes the limitations as to whether a foreign sovereign nation (or its political subdivisions, agencies, or instrumentalities) may be sued in U.S. courts—federal or state. It also establishes specific procedures for service of process and attachment of property for proceedings against a Foreign State. The FSIA provides the exclusive basis and means to bring a lawsuit against a foreign sovereign in the United States. In international law, the prohibition against suing a foreign government is known as state immunity.

=== Local governmental immunity ===
Counties and municipalities are not entitled to sovereign immunity in some states, but are in others. In Lincoln County v. Luning, the court held that the Eleventh Amendment does not bar an individual's suit in federal court against a county for nonpayment of a debt. By contrast, a suit against a statewide agency is considered a suit against the state under the Eleventh Amendment. In allowing suits against counties and municipalities, the court was unanimous, relying in part on its "general acquiescence" in such suits over the prior thirty years. William Fletcher, a professor of legal studies at Yale University, explains the different treatment on the ground that in the nineteenth century, a municipal corporation was viewed as more closely analogous to a private corporation than to a state government.

County and municipal officials, when sued in their official capacity, can only be sued for prospective relief under federal law. Under state law, however, the court in Pennhurst noted that even without immunity, suits against municipal officials relate to an institution run and funded by the state, and any relief against county or municipal officials that has some significant effect on the state treasury must be considered a suit against the state, and barred under the doctrine of sovereign immunity.

=== Derivative sovereign immunity ===
In Yearsley v. W.A. Ross Constr. Co., 309 U.S. 18 (1940), the Supreme Court held that government contractors may not be held liable for injurious conduct when the contractor's action was authorized by the Government and the "authority to carry out the project was validly conferred by Congress."

However, in GEO Group, Inc. v. Menocal, 607 U.S. _ (2026) the Court clarified that Yearsley only provides a defense from liability, not an immunity in the technical sense. A Yearsley defense does not immunize illegal conduct, does not allow government contractors to avoid trial, and is not appealable before final judgment. The Court stated that its precedent "den[ies] that government agents can assert –whether always or sometimes– a “derived” form of sovereign immunity. Rather [...] sovereign immunity belongs alone to the Government.”

== Exceptions and abrogation ==
There are exceptions to the doctrine of sovereign immunity derived from the Eleventh Amendment:

=== Discrimination ===
If the state or local government entities receive federal funding for whatever purpose, they cannot claim sovereign immunity if they are sued in federal court for discrimination. The United States Code, Title 42, Section 2000d-7 explicitly says this.

The 2001 Supreme Court decision of Board of Trustees of the University of Alabama v. Garrett seems to nullify this; however, numerous appellate court cases, such as Doe v. Nebraska in the 8th Circuit and Thomas v. University of Houston of the 5th Circuit have held that, as long as the state entity receives federal funding, then the sovereign immunity for discrimination cases is not abrogated, but voluntarily waived. Since the receiving of the federal funds was optional, then the waiver of sovereign immunity was optional. If a state entity wanted its sovereign immunity back, all they have to do in these circuits is stop receiving federal funding.

However, the 2nd Circuit does not share this ideal. As of 2010, it was the only federal court of appeals to decide that a state may refuse to be sued for discrimination by asserting sovereign immunity.

=== Arbitration ===
In C & L Enterprises, Inc. v. Citizen Band, Potawatomi Indian Tribe of Oklahoma, 532 U.S. 411 (2001), the Supreme Court held that sovereigns are not immune under the Federal Arbitration Act. Since arbitration is a matter of contract between the parties, agreeing to participate in arbitration constitutes consent to be subject to the arbitrator's jurisdiction, thus constituting a voluntary waiver of immunity.

=== Suits brought by the United States ===
Because the U.S. is a superior sovereign, it may need to bring suit against a state from time to time. According to the Supreme Court, proper jurisdiction for a contract suit by the United States federal government against a state is in federal district court.

=== Suits brought by another state ===
Similar to the U.S. v. state exclusion above, a state may also sue another state in the federal court system. Again, there would be a conflict of interest if either state's court system tried the case. Instead, the federal court system provides a neutral forum for the case.

Under Article III, Section 2 of the United States Constitution, the Supreme Court of the United States has original jurisdiction over cases between states. Congress, if it so chooses, may grant lower federal courts concurrent jurisdiction over cases between states. However, Congress has not yet chosen to do so. Thus, the United States Supreme Court currently has original and exclusive jurisdiction over cases between state governments.

=== Suits filed against state officials under the "stripping doctrine" ===
The "stripping doctrine" permits a state official who used his or her position to act illegally to be sued in his or her individual capacity. However, the government itself is still immune from being sued through respondeat superior. The courts have called this "stripping doctrine" a legal fiction. Therefore, a claimant may sue an official under this "stripping doctrine" and get around any sovereign immunity that that official might have held with his or her position.

When a claimant uses this exception, the state cannot be included in the suit; instead, the name of the individual defendant is listed. The claimant cannot seek damages from the state, because the claimant cannot list the state as a party. The claimant can seek prospective, or future, relief by asking the court to direct the future behavior of the official.

For example, Ex parte Young allows federal courts to enjoin the enforcement of unconstitutional state (or federal) statutes on the theory that "immunity does not extend to a person who acts for the state, but [who] acts unconstitutionally, because the state is powerless to authorize the person to act in violation of the Constitution." Althouse, Tapping the State Court Resource, 44 Vand. L. Rev. 953, 973 (1991). Pennhurst State School and Hospital v. Halderman (465 U.S.) ("the authority-stripping theory of Young is a fiction that has been narrowly construed"); Idaho v. Coeur d'Alene Tribe of Idaho ("Young rests on a fictional distinction between the official and the State"). The Young doctrine was narrowed by the court in Edelman v. Jordan, which held that relief under Young can only be for prospective, rather than retrospective, relief; the court reasoned that the Eleventh Amendment's protection of state sovereignty requires the state's coffers to be shielded from suit. Prospective relief includes injunctions and other equitable orders, but would rarely include damages. This limitation of the Young doctrine "focused attention on the need to abrogate sovereign immunity, which led to the decision two years later in Fitzpatrick." Althouse, Vanguard States, supra, at 1791 n.216

The 42 U.S.C. § 1983 allows state officials to be sued in their individual or official capacities, a principle which was demonstrated again in Brandon v. Holt.

=== Suits as to which Congress has abrogated the states' Eleventh Amendment immunity ===
The federal government and nearly every state have passed tort claims acts allowing them to be sued for the negligence, but not intentional wrongs, of government employees. The common-law tort doctrine of respondeat superior makes employers generally responsible for the torts of their employees. In the absence of this waiver of sovereign immunity, injured parties would generally have been left without an effective remedy. See Brandon v. Holt.

Under the abrogation doctrine, while Congress cannot use its Article I powers to subject states to lawsuits in either federal courts, Seminole Tribe v. Florida, or a fortiori its own courts, Alden, supra, it can abrogate a state's sovereign immunity pursuant to the powers granted to it by §5 of the Fourteenth Amendment, and thus subject them to lawsuits. Seminole, supra; Fitzpatrick v. Bitzer. However:

- The court requires "a clear legislative statement" of intent to abrogate sovereignty, Blatchford, supra; Seminole, supra.
- Because Congress' power under §5 is only "the power 'to enforce,' not the power to determine what constitutes a constitutional violation," for the abrogation to be valid, the statute must be remedial or protective of a right protected by the Fourteenth Amendment and "[t]here must be a congruence and proportionality between the injury to be prevented or remedied and the means adopted to that end," City of Boerne v. Flores. But "[t]he ultimate interpretation and determination of the Fourteenth Amendment's substantive meaning remains the province of the Judicial Branch." Kimel v. Florida Board of Regents. Simply put: "Under the City of Boerne doctrine, courts must ask whether a statutory remedy has 'congruence and proportionality' to violations of Section 1 rights, as those rights are defined by courts." Althouse, Vanguard States, Laggard States: Federalism & Constitutional Rights, 152 U. Pa. L. Rev. 1745, 1780 (2004)
- States can expressly waive sovereign immunity, but do not do so implicitly simply by participating in a commercial enterprise where Congress subjects market participants to lawsuits. College Savings Bank v. Florida Prepaid Postsecondary Education Expense Board.

The Court has found that somewhat different rules may apply to Congressional efforts to subject the states to suit in the domain of federal bankruptcy law. In Central Virginia Community College v. Katz, the Court held that state sovereign immunity was not implicated by the exercise of in rem jurisdiction by bankruptcy courts in voiding a preferential transfer to a state. Justice Stevens, writing for a majority of five (including Justice O'Connor, in one of her last cases before retirement, and Justices Souter, Ginsburg, and Breyer), referred to the rationale of an earlier bankruptcy decision, but relied more broadly on the nature of the bankruptcy power vested in Congress under Article I. "The question", he stated, "[was] not whether Congress could 'abrogate' state sovereign immunity in the Bankruptcy Act (as Congress had attempted to do); rather, because the history and justification of the Bankruptcy Clause, as well as legislation enacted immediately following ratification, demonstrate that [the Bankruptcy Clause] was intended not just as a grant of legislative authority to Congress, but also to authorize limited subordination of state sovereign immunity in the bankruptcy arena." In reaching this conclusion, he acknowledged that the Court's decision in Seminole Tribe and succeeding cases had assumed that those holdings would apply to the Bankruptcy Clause, but stated that the Court was convinced by "[c]areful study and reflection" that "that assumption was erroneous". The Court then crystallized the current rule: when Congressional legislation regulates matters that implicate "a core aspect of the administration of bankrupt estates", sovereign immunity is no longer available to the States if the statute subjects them to private suits.

The Court in Central Virginia Community College v. Katz added this caveat: "We do not mean to suggest that every law labeled a 'bankruptcy' law could, consistent with the Bankruptcy Clause, properly impinge upon state sovereign immunity".

=== Certain contracts with the government ===
By way of the Tucker Act, certain claims of monetary damages against the United States are exempt from sovereign immunity. These cases are heard by the United States Court of Federal Claims, or, for cases involving less than ten thousand dollars, a district court has concurrent jurisdiction.

Examples of contracts where immunity is waived include:

- Debts incurred.
- Salaries of government employees.
- Tax refunds that have not been sent.
- Commercial contracts.
- Any contract that has a provision in it specifically waiving sovereign immunity.

=== Actions taken in bad faith ===
If a plaintiff can demonstrate that the government's action was done in bad faith, the plaintiff can receive damages despite sovereign immunity. Typically if a party can demonstrate that the government intentionally acted wrongly with the sole purpose of causing damages, that party can recover for injury or economic losses. For example, if access lanes to a major bridge are closed for repair and the closure results in severe traffic congestion, the action was in good faith and the state could not be sued. However, if, as in the Fort Lee lane closure scandal, the lanes were closed in retaliation against a mayor who declined to support a politician's campaign, with the explicit purpose of causing traffic jams, such lawsuits could proceed.

== See also ==
- Former Indian Reservations in Oklahoma
- Justice Against Sponsors of Terrorism Act
