= Seminole Tribe of Florida v. Florida =

- Supreme Court of the United States

Argued October 11, 1995 Decided March 27, 1996
- Full case name: Seminole Tribe of Florida, Petitioner v. State of Florida, et al.
- Citations: 517 U.S. 44 (more) 116 S. Ct. 1114; 134 L. Ed. 2d 252; 1996 U.S. LEXIS 2165; 64 U.S.L.W. 4167; 67 Empl. Prac. Dec. (CCH) ¶ 43,952; 42 ERC (BNA) 1289; 34 Collier Bankr. Cas. 2d (MB) 1199; 96 Cal. Daily Op. Service 2125; 96 Daily Journal DAR 3499; 9 Fla. L. Weekly Fed. S 484

Case history
- Prior: Motion to dismiss denied, 801 F. Supp. 655 (S.D. Fla. 1992); reversed, 11 F.3d 1016 (11th Cir. 1994); cert. granted, 513 U.S. 1125 (1995).

Holding
- Congress does not have the power under the Commerce Clause to abrogate the sovereign immunity afforded to states under the 11th Amendment; the doctrine of Ex parte Young, which allows parties to seek relief against state officials for violations of the Constitution or laws of the United States, does not apply where Congress has already created what it deems a sufficient remedy.

Court membership
- Chief Justice William Rehnquist Associate Justices John P. Stevens · Sandra Day O'Connor; Antonin Scalia · Anthony Kennedy; David Souter · Clarence Thomas; Ruth Bader Ginsburg · Stephen Breyer

Case opinions
- Majority: Rehnquist, joined by O'Connor, Scalia, Kennedy, Thomas
- Dissent: Stevens
- Dissent: Souter, joined by Ginsburg, Breyer

Laws applied
- U.S. Const. amend. XI
- This case overturned a previous ruling or rulings
- Pennsylvania v. Union Gas Co., 491 U.S. 1 (1989)

Seminole Tribe of Florida v. Florida, 517 U.S. 44 (1996), was a United States Supreme Court case in which the court held that Article One of the United States Constitution did not give Congress the power to abrogate the sovereign immunity of the states under the Eleventh Amendment. It also held, however, that abrogation was permitted where necessary to enforce rights under the Fourteenth Amendment as per Fitzpatrick v. Bitzer (1976). It also held that the doctrine of Ex parte Young (1908), allowing state officials to be sued in their official capacity for prospective injunctive relief, was inapplicable under the circumstances in question because any remedy was limited to the one that Congress had provided.

== Background ==
=== Native American gaming history ===
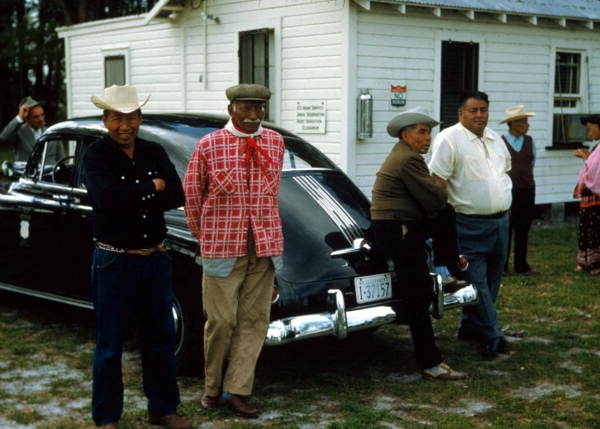
Seminole men at the Hollywood Reservation

In the late 1970s, the Seminole Tribe of Florida built a large bingo facility on the Dania Reservation in Fort Lauderdale, Florida. The tribe then sued the Broward County sheriff in federal court to prevent him from enforcing state law on tribal land, as he had threatened to arrest anyone who played bingo at the tribal facility. The United States District Court for the Southern District of Florida heard the case in Seminole Tribe of Florida v. Butterworth, issuing a preliminary injunction in favor of the tribe in 1979 and a permanent injunction the following year. The sheriff appealed, and the Fifth Circuit affirmed the lower court's decision based on the 1953 federal Public Law 280 and the United States Supreme Court interpretation of that law in Bryan v. Itasca County (1976) holding that a state did not have jurisdiction over lawful conduct when the law involved was primarily regulatory in nature. It therefore held that since Florida allowed bingo gaming by other groups, its laws were regulatory and had no effect on Native American land.

Butterworth led to a large increase in Native American gaming, which had been shut down in 1949 by a Wisconsin court decision holding that Native Americans could not use slot machines or other gambling instruments on their reservations. Since bingo did not use those prohibited instruments, Native American tribes were free to open bingo halls. By 1983, about 180 bingo halls were operated by tribes on reservations across the nation. This prompted a flood of litigation as individual states attempted to shut down Native American gaming, efforts which typically failed.

As various Native American tribes sought to obtain a steady source of revenue through gaming, some tribes went further than others. While abiding by the federal prohibition on gambling machines and instruments, the Puyallup Tribe of Indians opened casinos on their Washington reservation that offered blackjack, poker, and craps. Federal law enforcement authorities arrested the tribal members operating the casino and in United States v. Ferris charged them with violating the Organized Crime Control Act, which adopted the criminal law of the state that the reservation or other federal property was located in rather than prohibiting gambling itself. Similar results occurred with the Lake Superior Chippewa in Michigan.

=== Legislation ===
Beginning in 1984, Congress began to hold hearings on Native American gaming. In 1987, Congress accelerated its consideration due to the Supreme Court decision in California v. Cabazon Band of Mission Indians (1987) that more or less prohibited state regulation while allowing federal enforcement. States and non-tribal gaming interests opposed any tribal gaming. The United States Department of Justice argued that it would be unable to prevent organized crime from being involved in Native American gaming operations due at least in part to testimony to Congress suggesting that the Cabazon Reservation was being run by non-Indian John Nichols, who reportedly had ties to organized crime and was involved in at least one murder for hire plot. The National Congress of American Indians, meanwhile, called for preemptive legislation allowing tribal control and prohibiting state interference.

In 1988, Congress passed the Indian Gaming Regulatory Act (IGRA), which established three classes of gaming: Class I, traditional, low value gaming, often for ceremonial purposes; Class II, bingo and like games such as pull-tabs and punchboards; and Class III, all other gaming, such as slot machines, craps, and poker. Tribes were allowed to regulate all Class I/II gaming, though they would have to have their gaming ordinances for Class II gaming approved by the newly established National Indian Gaming Commission (NIGC). The act also set requirements for regulating Class III gaming to be governed by compacts between tribes and states and overseen by the NIGC.

Many Native American tribes were opposed to the IGRA, and the Mescalero Apache and Red Lake Band of Chippewa sued to have the law declared unconstitutional. The lawsuit was the first major attempt by a Native American tribe to reverse the 1903 federal policy dating to the widely critcized decision Lone Wolf v. Hitchcock, which allowed Congress to exercise plenary power over the tribes, including reneging on treaties. The attempt was unsuccessful, with the District Court for the District of Columbia holding that existing precedent allowed Congress to regulate the actions of the tribes.

The IGRA required states to negotiate with Native American tribes to create compacts governing Native American gaming. The statute provided that if a state failed to enter into such negotiations, or to negotiate in good faith, the tribes could sue the state in federal court in order to compel the states to negotiate. If the states still refused, the statute provided that the matter would ultimately be referred to the Secretary of the Interior. Congress asserted its power under the part of the Commerce Clause relating to commerce with Native Americans to pass such a statute, abrogating the immunity of states pursuant to its express powers.

=== Case history ===
The Seminole Tribe of Florida requested that the state enter into a negotiation to create a compact governing its gaming. When the state refused, the tribe filed suit under the IGRA against both the state of Florida and its governor, Lawton Chiles. The District Court for the Southern District of Florida declined to dismiss the case, but the Court of Appeals for the Eleventh Circuit reversed, holding that the Eleventh Amendment barred the suit and that Ex parte Young could not be used to force good faith negotiation. The tribe then filed a petition for certiorari to the Supreme Court, which granted the petition and docketed the case. Thirty-one additional states filed amicus briefs supporting Florida's position.

About twenty years earlier, in Fitzpatrick v. Bitzer (1976), the court had held that Congress could abrogate state sovereign immunity pursuant to its powers under the Fourteenth Amendment, which clearly contemplated limiting the power of the states. In Pennsylvania v. Union Gas Co. (1989), the court had held by a plurality that Congress could also abrogate sovereign immunity under the Commerce Clause. Justice William J. Brennan Jr. had been joined by three other justices in asserting that the Eleventh Amendment was nothing more than a reflection of common law sovereignty that could be swept aside by Congress, Justice Antonin Scalia had also been joined by three other justices in taking the opposite view, and Justice Byron White wrote a separate opinion agreeing with Brennan that Congress had such power but disagreeing with his rationale.

In Seminole Tribe of Florida v. Florida, the Supreme Court was thereby once again presented with the question of whether Congress had the power to abrogate the sovereign immunity of the states pursuant to the powers granted to it in Article One.

== Opinion of the Court ==
Chief Justice William Rehnquist wrote the majority opinion, joined by Justices Sandra Day O'Connor, Antonin Scalia, Anthony Kennedy, and Clarence Thomas. He struck down Congress' abrogation of state sovereign immunity as unconstitutional and further held that the doctrine of Ex parte Young did not apply.

Rehnquist began by repudiating the precedential value of Pennsylvania v. Union Gas Co. (1989), noting that there had been no single majority rationale in that case and characterizing it as a major departure from the 1890 case Hans v. Louisiana, which had established the modern doctrine of sovereign immunity. He argued that allowing Congress to abrogate sovereign immunity improperly expanded the jurisdiction of the federal courts beyond what Article Three of the Constitution permitted. He also stated that the Eleventh Amendment had further protected the states' sovereign immunity, and that the Fourteenth Amendment had placed limitations on the Eleventh, but only with respect to the rights guaranteed in the Fourteenth.

Rehnquist also wrote that the doctrine of Ex parte Young (1908) did not apply, stating that where Congress had provided a remedial scheme, the courts should not imply the existence of additional remedies based on the rationale in the 1988 Supreme Court case Schweiker v. Chilicky.

=== Dissents ===
==== Souter ====
Justice David Souter wrote a lengthy dissent joined by Justices Ruth Bader Ginsburg and Stephen Breyer. Souter focused on the language of the Eleventh Amendment, arguing that it only eliminated diversity jurisdiction between states and citizens of other states. He rejected what he termed Hans' "critical errors" of reading common law sovereign immunity to extend the jurisdictional bar of the Eleventh Amendment to suits against states by their own citizens. He discounted the importance of common law in interpreting the Constitution on the basis that it was such a new and unprecedented device at the time of its creation that it must have been intended as a rejection of the common law that came before it. As support, he noted that the Framers of the Constitution did not include language adopting common law that had already been adopted by many of the states in their own constitutions. He also stated that Congress had rejected proposed language for the Eleventh Amendment which would have explicitly barred suits against states by their own citizens and prevented Congress from abrogating this bar.

Souter also disagreed with the majority's rejection of Ex parte Young, noting that Young rested on a jurisdictional device while Chilicky, which Rehnquist had relied upon to reject Young, was a rejection of the proposed extra-statutory remedy. Souter argued that it was implausible that Congress would wish its statute to be made completely unenforceable simply because it had included a remedy for those injured by the failure of states to abide by that statute.

==== Stevens ====
Justice John Paul Stevens dissented alone, agreeing with Justice Souter's dissent but adding additional observations. In particular, Stevens noted that neither Justice Iredell's dissent in Chisholm v. Georgia nor the majority opinion in Hans had addressed situations in which Congress had specifically authorized a lawsuit against a state, and argued that both opinions had presumed that such a suit was in fact possible.

== Subsequent developments and legacy ==
Seminole Tribe was described as having "exemplified the Court's increasingly adamant refusal to countenance the headlong expansion of Congress's regulatory power under the Constitution's Commerce Clause". In Alden v. Maine (1999), while holding that Congress may not use its Article One powers to allow people to sue a state in that state's own courts without the state's consent, the court stated that:

[S]overeign immunity derives not from the Eleventh Amendment but from the structure of the original Constitution itself.... Nor can we conclude that the specific Article I powers delegated to Congress necessarily include, by virtue of the Necessary and Proper Clause or otherwise, the incidental authority to subject the States to private suits as a means of achieving objectives otherwise within the scope of the enumerated powers.

The Supreme Court has since narrowed the scope of Seminole Tribe. In Central Virginia Community College v. Katz (2006), the court held 5–4 that the Bankruptcy Clause of Article One abrogated state sovereign immunity. In PennEast Pipeline Co. v. New Jersey (2021), the court held that the federal eminent domain power abrogated state sovereign immunity, with Justice John Roberts stating for a 5–4 majority that "although nonconsenting States are generally immune from suit, they surrendered their immunity from the exercise of the federal eminent domain power when they ratified the Constitution." In Torres v. Texas Department of Public Safety (2022), the court held that federal law related to the nation's defense abrogated state sovereign immunity, with Justice Stephen Breyer also stating for a 5–4 majority that "text, history and precedent show that the states, in coming together to form a union, agreed to sacrifice their sovereign immunity for the good of the common defense."

== See also ==
- List of United States Supreme Court cases, volume 517
- List of United States Supreme Court cases
- Lists of United States Supreme Court cases by volume
- List of United States Supreme Court cases by the Rehnquist Court
- Copyright Remedy Clarification Act
