= Central Virginia Community College v. Katz =

- Supreme Court of the United States

Argued October 31, 2005 Decided January 23, 2006
- Full case name: Central Virginia Community College, et al. v. Katz, Liquidating Supervisor for Wallace's Bookstores, Inc.
- Docket no.: 04-885
- Citations: 546 U.S. 356 (more) 126 S. Ct. 990; 163 L. Ed. 2d 945
- Argument: Oral argument

Case history
- Prior: 106 F. App'x 341 (6th Cir. 2004); cert. granted, 544 U.S. 960 (2005).

Holding
- A bankruptcy trustee's proceeding to set aside the debtor's preferential transfers to state agencies is not barred by sovereign immunity.

Court membership
- Chief Justice John Roberts Associate Justices John P. Stevens · Sandra Day O'Connor; Antonin Scalia · Anthony Kennedy; David Souter · Clarence Thomas; Ruth Bader Ginsburg · Stephen Breyer

Case opinions
- Majority: Stevens, joined by O'Connor, Souter, Ginsburg, Breyer
- Dissent: Thomas, joined by Roberts, Scalia, Kennedy

Laws applied
- U.S. Const. Art. I § 8

Central Virginia Community College v. Katz, 546 U.S. 356 (2006), is a United States Supreme Court case holding that the Bankruptcy Clause of the Constitution abrogates state sovereign immunity. It is significant as one of only three cases allowing Congress to use an Article I power to authorize individuals to sue states, the others being PennEast Pipeline Co. v. New Jersey and Torres v. Texas Department of Public Safety.

== Background ==
In England, sovereign immunity referred to the concept that the king could not be sued without his consent. Beginning with Hans v. Louisiana (1890), a line of controversial Supreme Court cases had applied the concept of sovereign immunity to suits brought by private individuals against state governments. See The Eleventh Amendment. By the time Central Virginia Community College v. Katz came up for review, a majority of the justices on the Supreme Court had suggested Congress could never authorize individuals to sue a state pursuant to its Article I powers, including the Bankruptcy power. Seminole Tribe v. Florida.

Wallace's Bookstores did business with Central Virginia Community College, an arm of the state. While it was insolvent, Wallace's Bookstores made certain preferential transfers of property to the state to satisfy debts. After Wallace's Bookstores filed for bankruptcy, Katz, the bankruptcy trustee, sued the state under 11 U.S.C. § 547 to recover those transfers. The state raised sovereign immunity as a defense.

== Oral arguments ==
Oral argument was held on October 31, 2005, with William E. Thro arguing for the petitioners and Kim Martin Lewis for the respondents. During oral arguments, a light bulb exploded 44 feet (13 m) above the bench, showering the front of the court with small shards of glass. Chief Justice John Roberts, who had been on the court for less than a month, quipped that "it's a trick they play on new chief justices all the time," prompting laughter, "we're even more in the dark now than before."

== Opinion of the Court ==
In an opinion by Justice Stevens, the Court rejected the state's claim of sovereign immunity. The Court first noted that during the time the Articles of Confederation were in effect, states often did not recognize another state's discharge of a person's debt. This patchwork of bankruptcy laws made it difficult for people in debt to get out of debtors' prison. In light of this history, the Court interpreted Congress' power under the Bankruptcy Clause to make "uniform laws on the subject of bankruptcies" to include the power to abrogate state sovereign immunity.

The Court stated early bankruptcy legislation also supported its interpretation of the Bankruptcy Clause. It noted that in 1800, when concerns for state sovereign immunity ran fervent, Congress, with no recorded objection, gave federal courts power to release debtors from state prison through the writ of habeas corpus.

In coming to its conclusion, the Court declined to follow dicta in Seminole Tribe v. Florida suggesting a contrary result.

=== Dissent ===
Justice Thomas, writing for himself and three other justices, argued the historical record indicated states did not give up their sovereign immunity under the Bankruptcy Clause. The dissenters would have followed the view that nothing in Article I abrogates state sovereign immunity.
