= Atascadero State Hospital v. Scanlon =

- Supreme Court of the United States

Argued March 25, 1985 Decided June 28, 1985
- Full case name: Atascadero State Hospital, et al. v. Douglas James Scanlon
- Citations: 473 U.S. 234 (more) 105 S. Ct. 3142; 87 L. Ed. 2d 171; 1985 U.S. LEXIS 89; 53 U.S.L.W. 4985; 38 Fair Empl. Prac. Cas. (BNA) 96; 38 Fair Empl. Prac. Cas. (BNA) 97; 37 Empl. Prac. Dec. (CCH) ¶ 35,329; 1 Am. Disabilities Cas. (BNA) 758

Holding
- California's acceptance of funds and participation in programs funded under the Rehabilitation Act are insufficient to establish that it consented to suit in federal court.

Court membership
- Chief Justice Warren E. Burger Associate Justices William J. Brennan Jr. · Byron White; Thurgood Marshall · Harry Blackmun; Lewis F. Powell Jr. · William Rehnquist; John P. Stevens · Sandra Day O'Connor

Case opinions
- Majority: Powell, joined by Burger, White, Rehnquist, O'Connor
- Dissent: Brennan, joined by Marshall, Blackmun, Stevens
- Dissent: Blackmun, joined by Brennan, Marshall, Stevens
- Dissent: Stevens

Laws applied
- U.S. Const. amend. XI

Atascadero State Hospital v. Scanlon, 473 U.S. 234 (1985), was a United States Supreme Court case regarding Congress' power to abrogate the Eleventh Amendment sovereign immunity of the states.

Ordinarily, sovereign immunity prohibits the states from being sued, and the Eleventh Amendment prohibits states from being sued without consent in federal court; however, there are exceptions. A state can waive its sovereign immunity, and in Fitzpatrick v. Bitzer, 427 U.S. 445 (1976), the Supreme Court had emphasized that Congress could abrogate state sovereign immunity pursuant to powers granted it by the Civil War Amendments. The Court noted that Edelman v. Jordan, 415 U.S. 651 (1974), however, had recognized that "the Eleventh Amendment implicates the fundamental constitutional balance between the Federal Government and the States," Atascadero, at 238, the Court had applied a clear statement rule to waiver. The Court will only deem the state to have waived its immunity when the waiver is couched in "the most express language or by such overwhelming implication from the text as [will] leave no room for any other reasonable construction." Murray v. Wilson Distilling Co., 213 U.S. 151, 171 (1909).

In Atascadero, the Court made the rule symmetrical: just as purported waiver requires a clear statement, so too a purported abrogation requires a clear statement. Reiterating its "reluctance to infer that a State's immunity from suit in the federal courts has been negated[,] stem[ming] from recognition of the vital role of the doctrine of sovereign immunity in our federal system," Pennhurst State School and Hospital v. Halderman, 465 U.S. 89, 98 (1984) (Pennhurst II), and citing "[t]he fundamental nature of the interests implicated by the Eleventh Amendment," Atascadero, at 242, the court held "that Congress may abrogate the States' constitutionally secured immunity from suit in federal court only by making its intention unmistakably clear in the language of the statute." Id.

In response to Atascadero, Congress enacted a statute providing the clear language that the Court had demanded. The Rehabilitation Act Amendments of 1986 stated that "a State shall not be immune under the Eleventh Amendment... from suit in Federal court for a violation" of relevant provisions of federal law.
