= Chisholm v. Georgia =

- Supreme Court of the United States

Argued February 5, 1793 Decided February 18, 1793
- Full case name: Alexander Chisholm, Executors v. Georgia
- Citations: 2 U.S. 419 (more) 2 Dall. 419; 1 L. Ed. 440; 1793 U.S. LEXIS 249

Case history
- Prior: Original action filed, U.S. Supreme Court, August 1792 (Note: Chisholm first sued Georgia in the U.S. Circuit Court for the District of Georgia under the name Farquhar's Executor v. Georgia. However, it was widely reported that the case was an original suit filed in the United States Supreme Court. This may be due to the Circuit Court case being overlooked due to the use of the name Farquhar rather than Chisholm.)

Holding
- Article III, Section 2 grants federal courts jurisdiction in cases between a state and a citizen of another state wherein the state is the defendant.

Court membership
- Chief Justice John Jay Associate Justices James Wilson · William Cushing; John Blair Jr. · James Iredell

Case opinions
- Seriatim: Cushing
- Seriatim: Blair
- Seriatim: Wilson
- Seriatim: Jay
- Dissent: Iredell

Laws applied
- U.S. Const. art. III; Judiciary Act of 1789
- Superseded by
- U.S. Const. amend. XI

Chisholm v. Georgia, 2 U.S. (2 Dall.) 419 (1793), is the United States Supreme Court case generally considered the first with significance and impact. The court ruled in favor of Alexander Chisholm, executor of an estate of a citizen of South Carolina, by a 4–1 decision, holding that Article Three, Section 2 of the United States Constitution granted federal courts jurisdiction in cases between a state and a citizen of another state in which the state was the defendant.

Chisholm was superseded in 1795 by the Eleventh Amendment to the United States Constitution, which the court in Hollingsworth v. Virginia (1798) held to be binding on ongoing suits. The court also later added state sovereign immunity where the plaintiff was a citizen of the same state in federal courts in Hans v. Louisiana (1890) and in state courts in Alden v. Maine (1999).

== Background ==
On October 31, 1777, the Executive Council of Georgia authorized Thomas Stone and Edward Davies, as commissioners of the state, to purchase goods from Robert Farquhar, a South Carolina merchant, to help stationed Continental Army troops in Savannah, Georgia in dire need of supplies. Stone and Davies agreed to give Farquhar $169,613.33 (equivalent to $3,796,000 in 2025) in indigo or continental currency for his merchandise. However, Farquhar was not paid by the time of his 1784 death. His estate filed a claim for the debt with the Georgia legislature in 1789, but was met with a committee report refusing to pay and suggesting that it sue Stone and Davies because they had withdrawn the funds meant for Farquhar from the state treasury.

Alexander Chisholm, a merchant in Charleston and executor to Farquhar's estate, brought suit against Georgia in the United States Circuit Court for the District of Georgia. The court heard the case in October 1791 as Farquhar's Executor v. Georgia. Chisholm sought £100,000 (equivalent to $11,530,000 in 2025) sterling in payment and damages. Georgia governor Edward Telfair asserted sovereign immunity, arguing that Georgia was "a free, sovereign and independent State...[and] cannot be drawn or compelled... to answer, against the will of the said State of Georgia, before any Justices of the federal Circuit Court for the District of Georgia or before any Justices of any Court of Law or Equity whatsoever". United States Supreme Court Associate Justice James Iredell, who heard the case while riding circuit, and U.S. District Court Judge Nathaniel Pendleton dismissed the case, citing a lack of jurisdiction under the Judiciary Act of 1789 on the grounds that a state could not be sued by a citizen of another state in federal circuit court.

=== Case history ===
Chisholm filed a new suit before the Supreme Court under its original jurisdiction, likely in the February 1792 term. The case, captioned as Chisholm, Executor v. Georgia, sought damages amounting to $500,000 (equivalent to $12,450,000 in 2025). When no representative for Georgia appeared before the court in the August 1792 term, Chisholm's counsels John Hallowell and United States Attorney General Edmund Randolph agreed to hold over the case until the February 1793 term. Despite additional provision of notice by the court, no attorneys or representatives for Georgia appeared in the February 1793 term either, so the court only took Randolph's arguments.

== Supreme Court ==
In a 4–1 decision, the Supreme Court held for Chisholm, with Chief Justice John Jay and Justices William Cushing, James Wilson, and John Blair Jr. constituting the majority (Note: At that time, there was no opinion of the court or majority opinion; the justices delivered their opinions seriatim or individually, in ascending order of seniority. "[B]efore Chief Justice John Marshall came to the bench in 1801, each justice would typically write his own separate opinion. ... Before Marshall, Chief Justice Ellsworth tried to persuade his colleagues to adopt an Opinion of the Court. There were a few such opinions, but when he left the Court, the justices returned to their own ways." Rotunda, Ronald D. (October 9, 2017). "The Fall of Seriatim Opinions and the Rise of the Supreme Court". Verdict. Justia.com. Retrieved August 6, 2022. https://verdict.justia.com/2017/10/09/fall-seriatim-opinions-rise-supreme-court); only Justice James Iredell dissented. The Court ruled that Article Three of the United States Constitution, Section Two expressly extended federal judicial power to suits between a state and a citizen of another state, and held that it placed that power within the original jurisdiction of the Supreme Court. It also decided that the Constitution provided no exception limiting that authority only to suits where the state was the plaintiff.

=== Jay ===
Chief Justice Jay began by breaking down the argument made by the plaintiffs:

1. Can the State of Georgia, being one of the United States of America, be made a party-defendant in any case, in the Supreme Court of the United States, at the suit of a private citizen, even although he himself is, and his testator was, a citizen of the State of South Carolina?
2. If the State of Georgia can be made a party defendant in certain cases, does an action of assumpsit lie against her?
3. Is the service of the summons upon the Governor and Attorney General of the State of Georgia, a competent service?
4. By what process ought the appearance of the State of Georgia to be enforced?

=== Wilson ===
Justice Wilson began by stating the principle on which the case turned:

This is a case of uncommon magnitude. One of the parties to it is a State; certainly respectable, claiming to be sovereign. The question to be determined is, whether this State, so respectable, and whose claim soars so high, is amenable to the jurisdiction of the Supreme Court of the United States? This question, important in itself, will depend on others, more important still; and, may, perhaps, be ultimately resolved into one, no less radical than this: 'do the people of the United States form a Nation?'

=== Iredell ===
Justice Iredell dissented alone, stating:

A general question of great importance here occurs. What controversy of a civil nature can be maintained against a State by an individual? The framers of the Constitution, I presume, must have meant one of two things: either 1. in the conveyance of that part of the judicial power which did not relate to the execution of the other authorities of the general Government (which it must be admitted are full and discretionary, within the restrictions of the Constitution itself), to refer to antecedent laws for the construction of the general words they use; or, 2. to enable Congress in all such cases to pass all such laws as they might deem necessary and proper to carry the purposes of this Constitution into full effect, either absolutely at their discretion, or at least in cases where prior laws were deficient for such purposes, if any such deficiency existed.

Iredell stated that neither of these was argued in the case. He claimed that the Article Three, Section Two power granted to the federal courts was not self-executing and required that "all the courts of the United States must receive ... all their authority as to the manner of their proceeding, from the legislature only." Since the Judiciary Act of 1789 had not expressly authorized suits against states by residents of other states, therefore, he would have held that the federal courts did not inherently have jurisdiction over such suits and the case was ruled by common law. He then analyzed common law and found that states had sovereign immunity in England, and so by operation of common law had sovereign immunity in the United States in the absence of abrogating Congressional legislation.

== Subsequent developments ==
The states were surprised and displeased by the Chisholm decision. They called for another constitutional amendment precluding a state from being sued in federal court without that state's consent. By February 1795, 12/15 states had ratified the Eleventh Amendment to the United States Constitution in order to supersede the holding of Chisholm; South Carolina would later ratify it in 1797, New Jersey would symbolically ratify it in 2018, and Pennsylvania took no action either way. The Supreme Court held the Amendment's passage to be binding on ongoing suits in Hollingsworth v. Virginia (1798).

Under the Eleventh Amendment, citizens of one state can only sue another state with the state's consent. Since the 1868 passage of the Fourteenth Amendment to the United States Constitution, there had also been an exception for if Congress abrogates the states' immunity from suit pursuant to a valid exercise of Fourteenth Amendment remedial powers. The court later added state sovereign immunity where the plaintiff was a citizen of the same state in federal courts in Hans v. Louisiana (1890) and in state courts in Alden v. Maine (1999).

== See also ==
- Edelman v. Jordan, 415 U.S. 651 (1974)
- Atascadero State Hospital v. Scanlon, 473 U.S. 234 (1985)
- Seminole Tribe of Florida v. Florida, 517 U.S. 44 (1996)
- List of United States Supreme Court cases, volume 2
