= Pennsylvania v. Union Gas Co. =

- Supreme Court of the United States

Argued October 31, 1988 Decided June 15, 1989
- Full case name: Pennsylvania v. Union Gas Company
- Citations: 491 U.S. 1 (more) 109 S.Ct. 2273, 105 L.Ed.2d 1
- Argument: Oral argument

Case history
- Prior: 832 F.2d 1343 (CA3 1987), cert granted, 485 U.S. 958 (1988)

Holding
- The Comprehensive Environmental Response, Compensation, and Liability Act of 1980 (CERCLA), as amended by the Superfund Amendments and Reauthorization Act of 1986 (SARA), clearly expresses an intent to render states liable for damages in federal court. Furthermore, Congress may constitutionally render states liable for damages in federal court when legislating under its Article I powers.

Court membership
- Chief Justice William Rehnquist Associate Justices William J. Brennan Jr. · Byron White; Thurgood Marshall · Harry Blackmun; John P. Stevens · Sandra Day O'Connor; Antonin Scalia · Anthony Kennedy

Case opinions
- Majority: Brennan (Parts I and II), joined by Marshall, Blackmun, Stevens, Scalia
- Plurality: Brennan (Part III), joined by Marshall, Blackmun, Stevens
- Concurrence: Stevens
- Concur/dissent: White, joined by Rehnquist, O'Connor, Kennedy (Part I)
- Concur/dissent: Scalia, joined by Rehnquist, O'Connor, Kennedy (Parts II, III, and IV)
- Dissent: O'Connor
- Overruled by
- Seminole Tribe of Florida v. Florida (1996)

Pennsylvania v. Union Gas Co., 491 U.S. 1 (1989), was a 1989 United States Supreme Court case in which the court held that the Superfund Amendments and Reauthorization Act of 1986 (SARA) rendered states liable for monetary damages in federal court. Furthermore, the Court held that Congress could constitutionally abrogate the immunity from suit conferred to each state by the Eleventh Amendment to the United States Constitution, provided that it legislated under its Article I powers. This decision was overruled seven years later in Seminole Tribe of Florida v. Florida (1996).

== Decision ==
In this case, a four-justice plurality held that Congress could abrogate Eleventh Amendment immunity specifically when it acted under its Commerce Clause authority, and Justice Byron White agreed that Congress could abrogate this immunity, but did not join the plurality because he disagreed with its stated reasoning.

== Reactions ==
When the Court decided Union Gas, commentators expressed disappointment at its failure to definitively resolve the question of whether Congress could abrogate states' immunity under the Commerce Clause. Law professor John M. Rogers also criticized Justice White for voting to affirm the lower court's decision despite arguing at length that it was incorrect.
