= Edelman v. Jordan =

- Supreme Court of the United States

Argued December 12, 1973 Decided March 25, 1974
- Full case name: Joel Edelman, Director, Department of Public Aid of Illinois v. John Jordan
- Citations: 415 U.S. 651 (more) 94 S. Ct. 1347; 39 L. Ed. 2d 662; 1974 U.S. LEXIS 115

Case history
- Prior: Jordan v. Weaver, 472 F.2d 985 (7th Cir. 1973); cert. granted, 412 U.S. 937 (1973).
- Subsequent: Rehearing denied, 416 U.S. 1000 (1974); on remand, Jordan v. Trainor, 405 F. Supp. 802 (N.D. Ill. 1975), reversed, 551 F.2d 152 (7th Cir. 1977), on rehearing en banc, 563 F.2d 873 (7th Cir. 1977), affirmed sub nom., Quern v. Jordan, 440 U.S. 332 (1979).

Holding
- Because of the sovereign immunity recognized in the Eleventh Amendment, a federal court could not order a state to pay back funds that had unconstitutionally withheld from parties to whom they had been due.

Court membership
- Chief Justice Warren E. Burger Associate Justices William O. Douglas · William J. Brennan Jr. Potter Stewart · Byron White; Thurgood Marshall · Harry Blackmun; Lewis F. Powell Jr. · William Rehnquist

Case opinions
- Majority: Rehnquist, joined by Burger, Stewart, White, Powell
- Dissent: Douglas
- Dissent: Brennan
- Dissent: Marshall, joined by Blackmun

Laws applied
- U.S. Const. amend. XI; 42 U.S.C. § 1983

Edelman v. Jordan, 415 U.S. 651 (1974), was a United States Supreme Court case holding that the sovereign immunity recognized in the Eleventh Amendment to the United States Constitution prevented federal courts from ordering a state to pay back funds that had been unconstitutionally withheld from parties to whom those funds had been due.

== Background ==
Plaintiff John Jordan sued Illinois officials who administered the federal-state program Aid to the Aged, Blind, or Disabled. He alleged that the program's money had been administered in a manner violating both federal laws and the Fourteenth Amendment to the United States Constitution. Specifically, he claimed that the Illinois administrators were applying their own guidelines, ignoring federally-mandated time limits, and so did not get aid to applicants as quickly as required. The federal law required that applicants who qualified receive aid within 30 or 45 days, depending on their condition, but the Illinois agency was taking up to four months to disburse aid, and not paying retroactively to the time when the state should have started paying according to the federal guidelines once such aid was eventually distributed.

Jordan sought relief, including an injunction, to require the state to award him and others in his position the aid that they had lost out on because of the lateness in processing the applications. The United States District Court for the Northern District of Illinois found the Illinois guidelines to be inconsistent with the federal statute and ordered Illinois to follow the federal guidelines and to release to the aid applicants all funds "wrongfully withheld." The United States Court of Appeals for the Seventh Circuit affirmed, and the case was appealed to the Supreme Court, with agency director Joel Edelman named as the party representing Illinois.

=== Issue ===
Since Hans v. Louisiana (1890), the Eleventh Amendment had been held to recognize the sovereign immunity of states from federal suits by their own citizens. However, Ex parte Young (1908) had allowed an exception: citizens could seek injunctive relief against state officials to stop them from carrying out unconstitutional state policies.

In Edelman, the Supreme Court examined whether a federal court can require a state to restore funds that had wrongfully been withheld from citizens by the state if the order to restore the funds was an injunction that required the state to stop its wrongful possession of the funds.

== Opinion of the Court ==
Justice William Rehnquist, joined by Chief Justice Warren E. Burger and Justices Potter Stewart, Byron White, and Lewis F. Powell Jr., held in a 5–4 decision that private litigants could not avoid the bar of state sovereign immunity in cases where a state could be required to repay funds that it had wrongfully withheld. He stated that no case examining state sovereign immunity had held that states could be required to repay such funds, and that in almost all of the cases that had permitted retrospective recovery against the states, the state had not raised the issue of state sovereign immunity. He also overruled any case in which the state had raised the issue and lost.

Rehnquist distinguished the payment that had been ordered in this case from expenses that a state might incidentally incur to comply after an injunction is issued. He argued that the costs of post-judgment compliance were ancillary, but the costs of making up for pre-judgment non-compliance were more like an award of damages to the plaintiff. Noting that there were no precedents squarely on point, he also expressed disapproval of precedents that suggested allowing restoration of funds that had been previously withheld.

Rehnquist also brushed aside an alternative theory raised by the Seventh Circuit that Illinois had waived its immunity by participating in the federal program. He stated that previous cases finding such a waiver had involved express language in the federal statute conditioning program funds on such a waiver, but that there was no such language in the statute then at issue, and so declined to find that participation in the program constituted "constructive consent." He instead wrote that consent to waive immunity from suit could be found only "by the most express language or by such overwhelming implications from the text as will leave no room for any other reasonable construction."

Rehnquist also rejected Justice Thurgood Marshall's suggestion that plaintiffs could recover under 42 U.S.C. § 1983, which permits parties to sue state actors to recover for civil rights violations. He argued that nothing in that statute suggested that Congress had intended to abrogate state sovereign immunity by its passage.

Finally, Rehnquist stated that it was not improper to consider the state sovereign immunity issue even though Illinois had not raised it in the trial court because state sovereign immunity is a jurisdictional bar which may be raised at any time.

=== Dissents ===
==== Douglas ====
Justice William O. Douglas would have held that there should be no distinction made between prospective relief and retrospective relief, as the drain on the state's treasury was the same in either case. He also contended that Illinois had waived its immunity by entering the federal program, since the Supreme Court had recently found other states to have waived immunity by joining similar programs. He therefore argued that Illinois had to have been aware of the possibility that entering the program would waive its own immunity, and its decision to participate in light of that danger showed a willingness to be held liable.

==== Marshall ====
Justice Thurgood Marshall, joined by Justice Harry Blackmun, argued that 42 U.S.C. § 1983 abrogated the immunity of the states and permitted a recovery from the state treasury if the rights of a citizen were violated by an official of the state.

==== Brennan ====
Justice William J. Brennan Jr. did not reach any of the questions on the limitations of sovereign immunity or waiver thereof that were considered by both the majority and by the other dissents. Instead, he argued that the Eleventh Amendment did not immunize states from being sued by their citizens at all. He stated that there was no question of what the purported immunity covered or whether it could be waived if it did not exist, noting that the amendment's language bars only suits against a state by citizens of other states. He argued that that left only common law sovereign immunity, which he stated had been surrendered by the states when they agreed to join into the United States.

== See also ==
- List of United States Supreme Court cases, volume 415
