= Ex parte Young =

- Supreme Court of the United States

Argued December 2–3, 1907 Decided March 23, 1908
- Full case name: Ex parte Edward T. Young, Petitioner
- Citations: 209 U.S. 123 (more) 28 S. Ct. 441; 52 L. Ed. 714; 1908 U.S. LEXIS 1726

Case history
- Prior: Petition for writs of habeas corpus and certiorari

Holding
- A lawsuit seeking an injunction against a state official did not violate the sovereign immunity of the state, because the state official was not acting on behalf of the state when he sought to enforce an unconstitutional law.

Court membership
- Chief Justice Melville Fuller Associate Justices John M. Harlan · David J. Brewer; Edward D. White · Rufus W. Peckham; Joseph McKenna · Oliver W. Holmes Jr. William R. Day · William H. Moody

Case opinions
- Majority: Peckham, joined by Fuller, Brewer, White, McKenna, Holmes, Day, Moody
- Dissent: Harlan

Laws applied
- U.S. Const. amend. XI

Ex parte Young, 209 U.S. 123 (1908), is a United States Supreme Court case that allows suits in federal courts for injunctions against officials acting on behalf of states of the union to proceed despite the State's sovereign immunity, when the State acted contrary to any federal law or contrary to the Constitution. Although such suits were challenged as actions against the state barred by the Eleventh Amendment, in the early twentieth century, federal courts recognized that they could enjoin state officials from enforcing unconstitutional laws that threatened property rights. Ex parte Young became the leading authority for this principle.

== Background ==
Ex parte Young arose from a challenge by railroad shareholders to Minnesota’s railroad rate regulations, which they argued violated due process. The case arose from a challenge to the constitutionality of Minnesota railroad rate laws and required the Supreme Court to determine whether a federal court could enjoin a state official despite the Eleventh Amendment.

The state of Minnesota passed laws limiting what railroads could charge in that state and established severe penalties, including fines and jail for violators. The railroad shareholders alleged that the Minnesota railroad rate laws violated the Fourteenth Amendment by establishing confiscatory rates that deprived the railroads of property without due process of law and denied them the equal protection of the laws. They also argued that the statutes' severe penalties prevented the railroads from obtaining judicial review because neither the companies nor their employees could risk violating the laws to challenge their constitutionality. The shareholders sued the railroads to prevent them from complying with the law. They also sued Edward T. Young, the Attorney General of Minnesota, to prevent him from enforcing the law.

Young argued that the suit was, in substance, a suit against the State of Minnesota and therefore barred by the Eleventh Amendment, but the court rejected that argument and entered a preliminary injunction against enforcement of the law pending a final decision. Young responded that he would defy Judge William Lochren’s order. The following day, Young obtained a writ of mandamus from a Minnesota state court directing the Northern Pacific Railway to adopt the statutory rates. The federal circuit court held Young in contempt for violating its injunction and ordered him into the custody of the United States marshal until he paid a $100 fine and dismissed the state court proceedings. Young then petitioned the Supreme Court of the United States for a writ of habeas corpus, arguing that his detention was unconstitutional.

== Legal background ==
The existence of separate state and federal court systems operating within the same territory has historically created questions of jurisdiction and conflicts between the two systems. While state courts generally possess broad jurisdiction over cases arising under state law, federal courts exercise jurisdiction in matters assigned to them by the Constitution and Congress. Although Section 265 of the Judicial Code (formerly the Anti-Injunction Act) bars federal interference with state court proceedings, federal courts have recognized exceptions based on other grants of federal jurisdiction and authority to protect their judgments.

The scope of state sovereign immunity in the federal courts had been debated since Chisholm v. Georgia (1793), which held that Article III permitted suits against states by citizens of another state. In response, Congress proposed and the states ratified the Eleventh Amendment, barring such suits. During the nineteenth century, however, the Supreme Court recognized that some suits against state officials could proceed notwithstanding the Eleventh Amendment, leading to questions about the extent to which sovereign immunity applied to actions against state officers.

In the 1890s, the Supreme Court began considering appeals from injunctions against state officials in railroad rate cases. In Smyth v. Ames (1898), the Court reaffirmed that a suit to prevent state officials from enforcing an unconstitutional statute was not a suit against the state within the meaning of the Eleventh Amendment. A year later, in Fitts v. McGhee (1899), the Court clarified that an injunction could issue only against a state official who had some connection with the enforcement of the challenged statute.

== Supreme Court ==
The Supreme Court agreed to hear the case to decide whether a federal court could enjoin a state official from enforcing an allegedly unconstitutional state law.

=== Decision ===
The Court, in an opinion written by Justice Rufus Wheeler Peckham, found that the Minnesota laws with respect to the railroad rates were unconstitutional, and moved on to the issue of whether the state official could be enjoined from prosecuting violations of such laws.

The Court held that a state official enforcing an unconstitutional law acted ultra vires and could not invoke Eleventh Amendment immunity to bar injunctive relief.

The Court also rejected the contention raised by Young that an injunction was inappropriate because the railroads could get an adequate remedy by testing the statute in the courts. The Court noted that the railroads could never recover the costs of obeying the law while waiting for it to be adjudicated unconstitutional.

Based on these findings, the Court held that suits may be brought to enjoin state officials from enforcing unconstitutional laws in the United States District Courts, which have the power to enjoin those officials from enforcing such laws.

==== Federal-question jurisdiction ====
The Court recognized that the suit presented a federal question because it challenged Minnesota’s railroad rate scheme under the Fourteenth Amendment. The Court relied on Smyth v. Ames in explaining that the constitutional validity of state-imposed rates was a federal issue, even though determining whether the rates were confiscatory involved factual questions. The existence of a federal question allowed the suit to proceed in federal court and provided the jurisdictional basis for the Circuit Court’s decision.

==== Merits ====
After resolving the jurisdictional barrier, the Court still had to identify a legal right supporting a nonstatutory cause of action for injunctive relief. The Court suggested that the Fourteenth Amendment could provide such a right and that the threat of repeated litigation could constitute an equitable injury. It also relied on a broader understanding of property rights, holding that the threatened enforcement of an unconstitutional statute could constitute a wrong against property sufficient to support an officer suit.

The Court also considered whether there was an adequate remedy at law. Failure to enjoin the unconstitutional statute would require either paying the increased rate or facing the threat of prosecution. Relying on earlier cases concerning burdens on judicial remedies, including Cotting v. Kansas City Stock Yards Co. (1901), the Court concluded that that the severe penalties effectively denied access to the courts because a law that imposes such burdens to test the validity of the law "works an abandonment of the right" to seek judicial review.

==== Eleventh Amendment ====
After holding that the enforcement provisions of Minnesota’s rate scheme were unconstitutional on their face because of the severe penalties for testing their validity, the Court turned to whether the railroad could obtain equitable relief against the Attorney General without violating the Eleventh Amendment.

Young contended that he was merely acting for the state of Minnesota when he sought to enforce its laws. The Court disagreed, holding that when a state official does something that is unconstitutional, the official cannot possibly be doing it in the name of the state, because the Supremacy Clause of the Constitution means that the Constitution overrides all the laws of the states, invalidating any contrary laws. Therefore, when a state official attempts to enforce an unconstitutional law, that individual is stripped of his official character. He becomes merely another citizen who can constitutionally be brought before a court by a party seeking injunctive relief.

The Court distinguished suits that were effectively against the State itself from suits seeking to restrain state officers from enforcing unconstitutional laws. Relying on cases including Osborn v. United States Bank (1824), Davis v. Gray (1872), and Poindexter v. Greenhow (1885), the Court recognized that an action against a state officer acting unlawfully was not necessarily a suit against the State.

=== Harlan's dissent ===
Justice John Marshall Harlan dissented, writing that the only reason that the suit was brought against Young was because he represented the state, and that the result of the suit would be to "tie the hands of the state". This was therefore no different from a suit against the state itself, prohibited by the Eleventh Amendment.

Harlan observed that the state can never act except through its officers, and this decision would deprive the state of the representation of its officers in court. He therefore condemned the decision as a "radical change in our government system" that "would place the states of the Union in a condition of inferiority never dreamed of when the Constitution was adopted or when the Eleventh Amendment was made a part of the supreme law of the land."

Harlan also contended that Constitutional rights can be enforced by suits in the state courts, instead of the federal courts. If the state's trial courts did not enforce the Constitution, they could be appealed up to the state supreme court, which could then be appealed to the U.S. Supreme Court.

== Analysis ==
=== Historical context ===
Ex parte Young arose during the Progressive Era, a period of political, economic, and social reform that sought to curb the influence of powerful corporations. Many Progressives viewed the federal judiciary as an obstacle to reform, criticizing the Supreme Court for invalidating state economic legislation and the lower federal courts for expanding the use of injunctions, particularly against labor activity. Decisions such as Lochner v. New York (1905) and In re Debs (1895) became prominent examples of what critics regarded as judicial interference with Progressive reforms.

Ex parte Young reached the Court amid continuing national controversy over state railroad regulation, judicial review of Progressive legislation, and the federal courts' use of injunctions. Railroads were a major focus of Progressive reform because of their economic power and the long-running controversy over freight and passenger rates. Beginning in the 1870s, states enacted laws limiting railroad rates, and the Supreme Court upheld such regulation in Munn v. Illinois (1877). Railroad companies and their shareholders frequently challenged state railroad rates in federal court, claiming that the rates were so low as to be confiscatory, thereby depriving them of property without due process of law in violation of the Fourteenth Amendment.

=== Theoretical context ===
Ex parte Young became a central part of the debate over the constitutional basis for an affirmative right of action to enjoin state officers from violating the Fourteenth Amendment. Such actions raised broader concerns about the relationship between state and federal authority and the circumstances in which federal courts could intervene against state officials.

More recently, scholars and jurists have debated whether Ex parte Young should be understood as authorizing injunctive relief only for plaintiffs facing threatened enforcement, or whether its reasoning extends to broader forms of prospective relief, including nationwide injunctions. The common-law origins of Ex parte Young can be traced through the development of judicial oversight of the emerging administrative state, beginning with the common-law jurisdiction of the English King's Bench and later shifting toward equitable remedies as courts concluded that existing legal remedies were insufficient. Drawing on the work of Frederic Maitland, recent scholarship argues that equity should be understood in its historical relationship to the common law rather than as a separate legal system. Maitland viewed equity as a supplementary system that developed alongside the common-law; gaps in equity existed because other remedies were available.

Samuel Bray has argued that nationwide injunctions depart from historical equitable practice by extending relief beyond the parties before the court, while acknowledging that the merger of law and equity complicates comparisons between historical equity and modern practice.

== Subsequent developments ==
Ex parte Young became a leading precedent on the relationship between federal judicial power, state sovereign immunity, and federalism. The decision drew criticism from many Progressives, who argued that it expanded the ability of federal courts to interfere with state legislative reforms, particularly in the area of railroad regulation.

The decision also narrowed the practical effect of the Eleventh Amendment by permitting federal courts to enjoin state officials from enforcing unconstitutional laws. In 1910, Congress responded by requiring constitutional challenges seeking to enjoin enforcement of state statutes to be heard by a three-judge panel of the United States district court rather than by a single judge. Modern Supreme Court decisions generally describe Ex parte Young as creating an exception to sovereign immunity based on the legal fiction that a suit against a state officer enforcing an unconstitutional law is not a suit against the state. John Harrison argues instead that the decision did not require such a fiction because it is better understood as an anti-suit injunction recognizing a constitutional defense to state enforcement. In Whole Woman’s Health v. Jackson (2021) the Supreme Court said Ex parte Young allowed state officials to be enjoined from bringing enforcement actions against certain private parties, but did not allow injunctions against state courts themselves.

During the Civil rights movement, Ex parte Young became an important vehicle for challenging allegedly unconstitutional state laws and practices in federal court. Although Ex parte Young remains good law, the Supreme Court has narrowed its application. In Seminole Tribe of Florida v. Florida (1996), the Court held that where Congress has established a detailed remedial scheme, plaintiffs may be precluded from seeking prospective injunctive relief against state officials under the Ex parte Young doctrine. Chief Justice John Roberts’s dissent in Douglas v. Independent Living Center of Southern California, Inc. (2012) read Ex parte Young as not permitting injunctive relief when plaintiffs are not subject to or threatened with enforcement proceedings by the state.].

In Free Enterprise Fund v. Public Company Accounting Oversight Board (2010), the Supreme Court cited Ex parte Young among the precedents recognizing the longstanding availability of equitable relief against unconstitutional government action, concluding that the government's argument "offers no reason and cites no authority" for treating Appointments Clause and separation-of-powers claims differently from other constitutional claims.

== See also ==
- List of United States Supreme Court cases, volume 209

== Works cited ==
- Brett, Sharon (2024). "Policing State Police: System Reform Within the "Fiction" of Ex parte Young" (PDF). Harvard Civil Rights-Civil Liberties Law Review. 59.
- Fowler, Ernest B. (1930). "Conflicts between State and Federal Courts". Dicta. 7 (4): 13–23.
- Harrison, John C. (2008). "Ex Parte Young" (PDF). Stanford Law Review. 60 (4): 989–1022.
- Murphy, Richard W. (2023). "A Zone for Nonstatutory Review of Constitutional Claims" (PDF). Ohio State Law Journal. 84 (2): 303–359.
- Pfander, James E.; Wentzel, Jacob P. (2020). "The Common Law Origins of Ex parte Young" (PDF). Stanford Law Review. 72 (5): 1269–1357.
- Sohoni, Mila (2020). "The Lost History of the "Universal" Injunction". Harvard Law Review. 133 (3).
