= Hans v. Louisiana =

- Supreme Court of the United States

Argued January 22, 1890 Decided March 3, 1890
- Full case name: Bernard Hans v. State of Louisiana
- Citations: 134 U.S. 1 (more) 10 S. Ct. 504; 33 L. Ed. 842; 1890 U.S. LEXIS 1943

Case history
- Prior: 24 F. 55 (C.C.E.D. La. 1885)
- Subsequent: None

Holding
- No "arising under" jurisdiction granted either in federal law or in article III of the U.S. Constitution permits a citizen to sue his own state in federal court, except where that state consents to be sued.

Court membership
- Chief Justice Melville Fuller Associate Justices Samuel F. Miller · Stephen J. Field; Joseph P. Bradley · John M. Harlan; Horace Gray · Samuel Blatchford; Lucius Q. C. Lamar II · David J. Brewer

Case opinions
- Majority: Bradley, joined by Fuller, Miller, Field, Gray, Blatchford, Lamar, Brewer
- Concurrence: Harlan

Laws applied
- U.S. Const. art. III, § 2; U.S. Const. amend. XI

Hans v. Louisiana, 134 U.S. 1 (1890), was a United States Supreme Court case holding that that the Eleventh Amendment prohibits a citizen of a U.S. state from suing that state in federal court, so citizens cannot bring suit against their own state for issues related to the federal Constitution and federal laws. The court left open the question of whether a citizen could sue their own state in state court. That ambiguity was resolved in Alden v. Maine (1999), in which the court held that a state's sovereign immunity also forecloses suits against one's own state in state court.

== Facts ==
The plaintiff was a citizen of the state of Louisiana who owned bonds issued by the state. He grew concerned that a recent change to the state constitution would render the bonds invalid, and so filed suit against Louisiana in District Court for the Eastern District of Louisiana. He asserted that the state was impairing the obligation of a contract, which was forbidden by Article One, Section 10 of the Constitution.

=== Issue ===
The question the court was required to answer was "whether a state can be sued in a Circuit Court of the United States by one of its own citizens upon a suggestion that the case is one that arises under the Constitution or laws of the United States." The court noted that the Constitution did not specifically provide for federal jurisdiction in suits between a citizen and a state, but that Article Three did give the federal courts jurisdiction over "all cases" arising under the Constitution and laws of the United States. Here, Hans was asserting a violation of the federal Constitution as his cause of action.

Furthermore, the court was aware that nearly a century earlier, the Supreme Court decision in Chisholm v. Georgia, 2 U.S. 419 (1793), holding that states could be sued in federal courts by citizens of other states, had sparked intense negative reactions, and that two years later Congress and the states had responded via the Eleventh Amendment. That amendment expressly forbade citizens of one state from suing another state, but said nothing about citizens suing their own state, so the court was left to determine whether such a suit was still allowed.

== Supreme Court ==
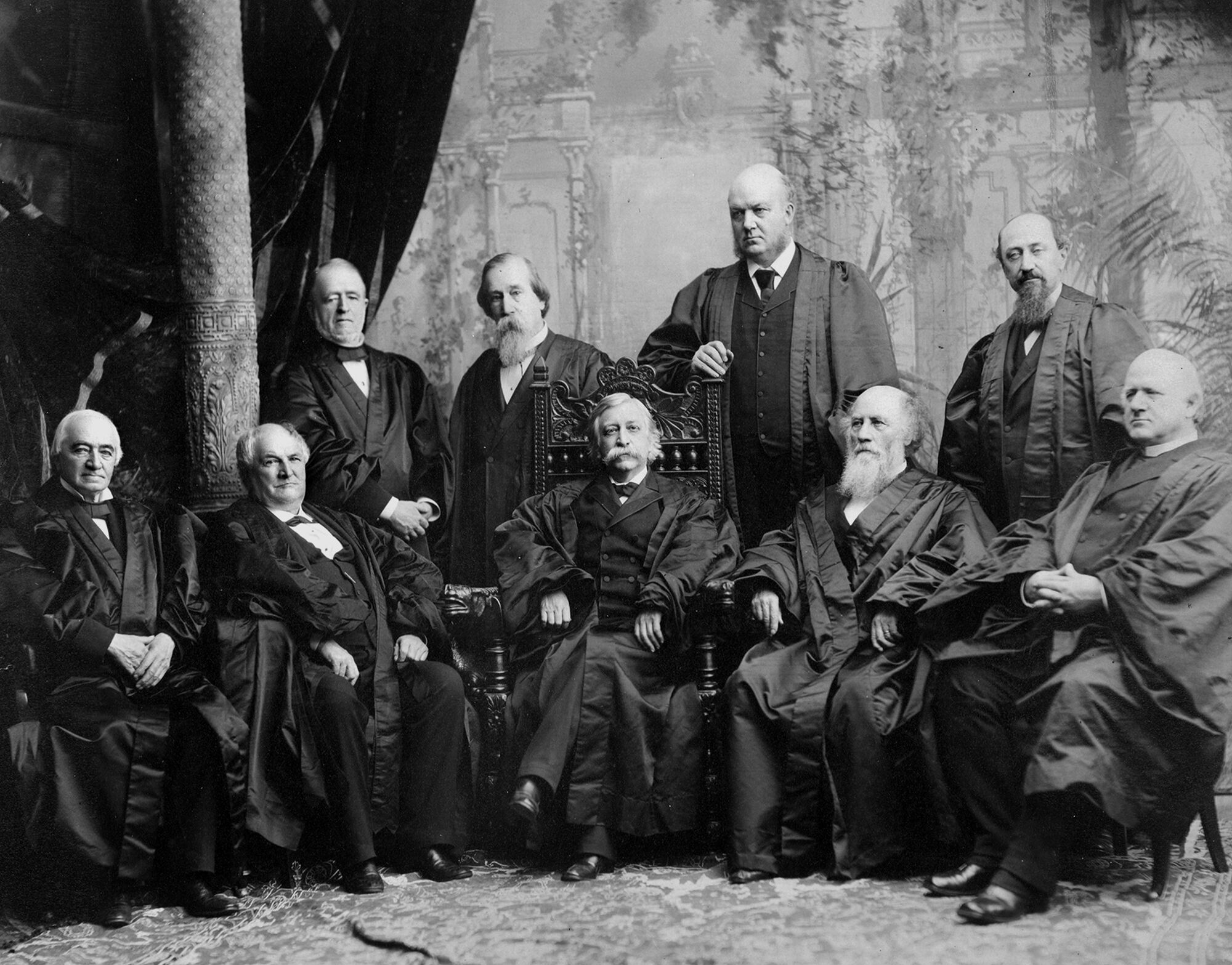
The Fuller Court in 1890.

Justice Joseph P. Bradley, joined by Chief Justice Melville Fuller as well as Justices Samuel Freeman Miller, Stephen Johnson Field, Horace Gray, Samuel Blatchford, Lucius Quintus Cincinnatus Lamar, and David J. Brewer, wrote the majority opinion. He first examined the discussions surrounding the ratification of the Constitution, noting that Alexander Hamilton had written in Federalist No. 81 that the Constitution would not remove the states' traditional immunity from lawsuits. He then examined statements made by James Madison and John Marshall at the Virginia Ratifying Convention held to ratify the Constitution in which both asserted that the federal power to hear claims brought by a state against a citizen of another state would not apply in the reverse.

Bradley suggested that the framers of the Constitution had not addressed the possibility of a citizen suing their own state because such a thing would simply have been inconceivable to them on the basis that at the time the Constitution was written, states had always been immune from such suits unless they consented to be sued. Furthermore, the Judiciary Acts of 1789 and 1802 had granted the federal courts jurisdiction "concurrent with the courts of the several states," which he argued suggested that Congress had not contemplated the possibility that federal courts would have any powers unknown to state courts.

Finally, Bradley noted an argument made by Justice John Marshall in another case, that the Supreme Court could hear appeals of a state's successful suit against a citizen precisely because that was not the same thing as a citizen's suit against the state. Instead, Marshall had compared them to suits against the United States, which were clearly forbidden.

=== Concurrence ===
Justice John Marshall Harlan wrote a brief concurring opinion agreeing with the outcome in the case but asserting that Bradley's criticism of Chisholm was misplaced. Harlan argued that Chisholm had been decided correctly based on the language of the Constitution at the time of the decision.

== Later developments ==
Ex parte Young (1908) determined that a citizen could sue a state official to prevent that official from carrying out a state policy deemed unconstitutional. Fitzpatrick v. Bitzer (1976) found that the Fourteenth Amendment gave the Congress the power to abrogate state immunity from suit to the extent that this was necessary to protect constitutional rights protected by the amendment.

In the 1987 Supreme Court case Welch v. Texas Department of Highways, four justices upheld Hans, while Justice Antonin Scalia concurred in part and concurred in the judgment, concluding that Congress had assumed Hans when enacting the Jones Act and the Federal Employer's Liability Act.

In the late 1990s, the Rehnquist Court issued a series of decisions reinforcing state immunity from suit under the Eleventh Amendment, starting with Seminole Tribe v. Florida (1996). In 1999's Alden v. Maine, it held that Congress may not use its Article One powers to allow people to sue a state in that state's own courts without the state's consent.

== See also ==
- List of United States Supreme Court cases, volume 134
