= Administrative Appeal Act =

The Administrative Appeal Act (行政不服審査法, Gyōsei fufuku shinsa-hō) is a statute passed in Japan in 1962. Along with the Administrative Litigation Act, it provides rules for the appeal and review of government decisions.

== Types of appeal ==
There are three types of appeal provided under the Act:

- Objection (異議申立て, igi mōshitate), filed against the deciding entity
- Demand for review (審査請求, shinsa seikyū), filed against an entity which has oversight over the deciding entity
- Demand for second review (再審査請求, sai-shinsa seikyū), an appeal of a review

Ordinarily, when the deciding entity has no administrative oversight (e.g. a cabinet ministry, mayor or governor), an objection must be filed in the first instance. When the deciding entity has an overseeing entity, a demand for review must be filed in the first instance. There are a number of exceptions provided by statute, however. Moreover, where the appeal concerns a failure to act, either an objection or a demand for review may be used at the discretion of the petitioner.

An objection or demand for review must be filed within 60 days of receiving notice of the act in question, and within one year of the act itself (the one-year limit may be extended upon showing of cause). There is no time limit on filing appeal of an inaction.

All substantive portions of these procedures are conducted in writing, although parties may be called to give oral testimony as part of the process.

== Injunctions ==
An appeal petition does not ordinarily stop the government from continuing the act in question. However, there are two situations where the government may be enjoined from further action:

1. In a demand for review, the overseeing entity may voluntarily order the deciding entity to suspend execution of its decision pending resolution of the appeal. This injunction may be issued unilaterally or at the request of the petitioner.
2. An injunction must be granted by an overseeing entity if necessary to avoid grave harm to the petitioner as a result of the decision; however, if the injunction would cause major effects on the public welfare, the injunction may be withheld.

== Decision ==
The response to an objection is called a decision (決定, kettei), and the response to a demand for review is called a ruling (裁決, saiketsu). In either case, there may be one of four results:

1. Dismissal for procedural reasons (却下, kyakka) is decided when the appeal has procedural flaws, such as when it is provided in an incorrect format or outside the prescribed time frame.
2. Dismissal on the merits (棄却, kikyaku) is decided when the appeal is procedurally sound, but when there is no factual reason to support the appeal.
3. A circumstantial (事情, jijō) decision or ruling is issued where the appeal has merit, but where overturning the decision would cause major harm to the public. This has the same effect as dismissal on the merits.
4. Otherwise, acceptance (認容, nin'yō) of the appeal is issued.

Should the appeal be accepted, the act in question may be overturned in whole or in part and any past enforcement may be declared invalid (and the appellant restored to their pre-enforcement position). The act may also be amended to the extent necessary to make it legal.

If an appeal of an inaction is accepted, the non-acting entity must act promptly following the acceptance of the appeal.
