= Lapides v. Board of Regents of University System of Georgia =

Paul Lapides v. Board of Regents of University System of Georgia
- Supreme Court of the United States

Argued February 25, 2002 Decided May 13, 2002
- Full case name: Lapides v. Board of Regents of University System of Georgia
- Docket no.: 01-298
- Citations: 535 U.S. 613 (more) 122 S. Ct. 1640; 152 L. Ed. 2d 806

Case history
- Prior: 251 F.3d 1372 (11th Cir. 2001); cert. granted, 534 U.S. 991 (2001).

Holding
- A State waives its Eleventh Amendment immunity when it removes a case from state court to federal court. The university officials' voluntary removal of the action expressly invoked the jurisdiction of the federal courts and thus constituted a waiver of sovereign immunity with regard to state law claims for which immunity was waived in state court. It is an established general principle that a State's voluntary appearance in federal court amounts to a waiver of its Eleventh Amendment immunity. Although Georgia was brought involuntarily into the case as a defendant in state court, it then voluntarily removed the case to federal court, thus voluntarily invoking that court's jurisdiction. Eleventh Circuit Court of Appeals reversed and remanded.

Court membership
- Chief Justice William Rehnquist Associate Justices John P. Stevens · Sandra Day O'Connor; Antonin Scalia · Anthony Kennedy; David Souter · Clarence Thomas; Ruth Bader Ginsburg · Stephen Breyer

Case opinion
- Majority: Breyer, joined by unanimous

Laws applied
- U.S. Const. amend. XI

Lapides v. Board of Regents of University System of Georgia, 535 U.S. 613 (2002), is a decision by the Supreme Court of the United States which ruled that a state voluntarily waives at least part of its Eleventh Amendment immunity when it invokes a federal court's removal jurisdiction. There has subsequently been a "circuit split" in federal courts regarding whether a state waives immunity from liability or only a federal forum.

== Background ==
Professor Paul D. Lapides filed suit in state court claiming that adding when they placed sexual harassment allegations in his personnel files violated state tort laws. The university system voluntarily moved the case to federal court and sought dismissal there.

== Opinion of the court ==
Justice Stephen Breyer delivered the opinion of the Court.

== See also ==
- List of United States Supreme Court cases, volume 535
- List of United States Supreme Court cases
