= John C. Harrison (law professor) =

American legal scholar

John Harrison

Academic background
- Education: University of Virginia (BA); Yale University (JD)

Academic work
- Discipline: Law
- Sub-discipline: Constitutional law, legal remedies
- Institutions: University of Virginia School of Law

John C. Harrison is an American legal scholar who is the James Madison Distinguished Professor of Law and Joseph C. Carter, Jr. Research Professor of Law at the University of Virginia School of Law.

== Early life and education ==
Harrison graduated from the University of Virginia with a Bachelor of Arts degree in 1977. He earned his Juris Doctor from Yale Law School in 1980. While in law school, Harrison served as an editor of the Yale Law Journal and as articles editor for The Yale Journal of International Law.

== Career ==
Harrison clerked for Judge Robert Bork of the United States Court of Appeals for the District of Columbia Circuit and worked as an associate at Patton Boggs in Washington, D.C. He then worked with the United States Department of Justice from 1983 to 1993, serving in numerous capacities, including deputy assistant attorney general in the Office of Legal Counsel from 1990 to 1993. Harrison is the author of a book on impeachment in the United States.

Harrison joined the law faculty at Virginia in 1993. His research and teaching interests include constitutional law and the law of remedies. He is the author of an important article on the Privileges or Immunities Clause. In 2008, Harrison was on leave to serve as counselor on international law in the Office of the Legal Adviser of the Department of State.
