= Blatchford v. Native Village of Noatak =

- Supreme Court of the United States

Decided June 24, 1991
- Full case name: Blatchford v. Native Village of Noatak
- Citations: 501 U.S. 775 (more)

Case history
- Subsequent: 38 F.3d 1505

Holding
- The Eleventh Amendment prevents tribes from filing lawsuits against the United States because they are not party to the Constitution; therefore, the United States must sue itself as a trustee for the tribe under United States v. Minnesota.

Court membership
- Chief Justice William Rehnquist Associate Justices Byron White · Thurgood Marshall; Harry Blackmun · John P. Stevens; Sandra Day O'Connor · Antonin Scalia; Anthony Kennedy · David Souter

Case opinions
- Majority: Scalia
- Concurrence: Blackmun, joined by Marshall, Stevens

Blatchford v. Native Village of Noatak, 501 U.S. 775 (1991), was a United States Supreme Court case in which the Court held that the Eleventh Amendment prevents tribes from filing lawsuits against the United States because they are not party to the Constitution; therefore, the United States must sue itself as a trustee for the tribe under United States v. Minnesota.

== Background ==
Alaska Native villages brought suit against Edgar Blatchford, in his capacity as the Commissioner of Alaska's Department of Community and Regional Affairs, seeking an order requiring payment to them of money allegedly owed under a state revenue-sharing statute. The federal District Court dismissed the suit as violating the Eleventh Amendment. The Ninth Circuit Court of Appeals reversed, first on the ground that 28 U.S.C. § 1362 constituted a congressional abrogation of Eleventh Amendment immunity, and then, upon reconsideration, on the ground that Alaska had no immunity against suits by Native tribes.

== Opinion of the court ==
The Supreme Court issued an opinion on June 24, 1991.

== Criticism ==
Blatchford was out of step with most prior Eleventh Amendment jurisprudence, which said sovereign immunity under the Amendment only applied to situations mentioned directly in its text.
