= Administrative Litigation Act =

Japanese statute enacted in 1962

The Administrative Litigation Act (行政事件訴訟法, Gyōsei jiken soshō-hō) is a Japanese statute enacted in 1962 which governs lawsuits involving the government of Japan. It overlays the Code of Civil Procedure, and the Code governs such cases to the extent the Act is silent.

== Types of administrative litigation ==
The Act provides for four types of administrative litigation:

- Appellate litigation (抗告訴訟, kōkoku soshō), an in-court appeal of an unlawful use of government authority. Such a claim may seek to cancel a government act (by far the most common type of administrative litigation), declare an act legally invalid, declare an inaction illegal, impose a duty or provide an injunction against future acts.
- Ex parte litigation (当事者訴訟, tōjisha soshō), which requires the resolution of a public law issue in the context of a private dispute. Most such cases are treated as ordinary civil litigation, so few cases are heard under the ex parte system. Common examples of ex parte cases include confirmation of Japanese nationality, and expropriation claims.
- Popular litigation (民衆訴訟, minshū soshō), essentially a class action of affected individuals against the government. The most common types are election-related litigation and citizen suits under the Local Autonomy Law.
- Entity litigation (機関訴訟, kikan soshō), litigation between administrative entities or organs.

== Objection by the Prime Minister ==
Objection by the Prime Minister is that the Prime Minister challenge to that a court order to suspend execution in the avoidance litigation. This is prescribed by the article 27 in the law. This institution is in only Japan, and no similar institution in another country.

Many administrative law jurists do not admit that this institution is constitutional, by reason of that violation to the principle of separation of powers.

However, in 1969, the Tokyo District Court reject crime of a jurist who appeal that this institution is not constitutional.

== Administrative litigation versus other means of appeal ==
The Administrative Appeal Act may also be used to appeal a wrongful government act. Administrative appeals are made directly to the government body whose act is being appealed. Ordinarily the petitioner may choose either venue to contest a government act. However, there are certain special cases (such as tax-related claims) where an administrative appeal process must be completed before a court may hear the case.
