= Byrne v Ireland =

Irish Supreme Court case

Byrne v. Ireland
- Court: Supreme Court of Ireland
- Full case name: Kathleen Byrne v Ireland and the Attorney General
- Decided: 1 January 1972
- Citation: [1972] IR 241

Court membership
- Judges sitting: Ó Dálaigh C.J., Walsh J., O'Keeffe P., Budd and FitzGerald JJ

Case opinions
- The court held that the State was not immune from tortious liability.
- Dissent: FitzGerald J.

Byrne v Ireland [1972] IR 241 is a landmark Supreme Court of Ireland case where the court held that the State was not immune from tortious liability and thus abolished the immunity of the State in tort. Therefore, the State could be sued for the actions of its servants. This case also determined that the Attorney General was the appropriate party to represent the State in these tort cases.

== Facts of the case ==
The plaintiff (Miss Kathleen Byrne) was walking on a footpath outside her home in County Wicklow on September 18, 1965, when it subsided causing her an injury; a cable-laying team from the Department of Posts and Telegraphs had been working on the sidewalk. Byrne sued the "People of Ireland" and the Attorney General for negligence, breach of statutory duty and nuisance as a result of the actions of the state's servants. After an intervention by the Chief State Solicitor, "Ireland" was substituted for the "People of Ireland" in the action. The case originally went to the High Court in 1968, which dismissed the plaintiff's case with Murnaghan J. holding that Article 5 of the Constitution, where the sovereignty of the state is asserted, precludes actions where the state would be a defendant.

The case then proceeded on appeal to the Supreme Court where it was considered in 1969 and the majority decision of the Supreme Court was delivered on 30 July 1971. The judge presiding in the High Court was Murnaghan J. and the Supreme Court justices were Walsh J., Budd J., Fitzgerald J., O'Keeffe, J. and Chief Justice O'Dalaigh. The Supreme Court found that the state was a juristic person and therefore could be sued, and was vicariously liable for the actions of its servants. Therefore, the Court found in favour of Byrne. Helen Whately of the office of the Director of Public Prosecutions summarized the court's findings:

...the Supreme Court rejected the State's contention that it was immune from tortuous liability; the State was found to be a juristic person who would be vicariously liable for the negligent acts of its servants committed in the course of employment. The plaintiff, therefore, succeeded in her action for damages for injuries sustained when she fell into a trench dug on the authority of the Minister for Posts and Telegraphs. The Court further held that the Attorney General is the appropriate person to represent the State against such a claim for damages (Whateley, 2010:4).

== The High Court ==
The plaintiff argued the following points:

1. The state is a juristic person
2. The acts of the state can only be carried out through its agents
3. The state cannot be immune from laws internal to Ireland, and is not above the law
4. The state is subject to the constitution
5. The injuries suffered by the plaintiff resulted from the negligence of agents of the state.

The judge specified that where Ireland is mentioned in the constitution, it is also used interchangeably with the state, and referred to the national territory, but not the people of Ireland. The judge laid out that while Ireland has the characteristic of juristic personality (based on judgments in Comyn v Attorney General, and Commissioners of Public Works v. Kavanagh) because it holds property, it does not mean that it is "a juristic person capable of acting in every regard, and in all respects, as if were a company or a corporation; or that it is capable of being sued in the Courts" (Murnaghan, J, 1972:250). The judgment in the Carolan v. Minister for Defence case was that there could be no vicarious liability owing to the Minister for Defence due to the negligence of his driver because they were fellow servants. The judge did address the issue of the Civil Liability Act (1961) which seemed to acknowledge that the state could be sued, but differentiated the point by asserting that one of the organs of the state (in this context, the Minister for Finance) could be sued without implying the loss of legal immunity to the state. Murnaghan J. did not leave the plaintiff without reference to a legal remedy open to her, which was to seek damages from the individuals involved in the case. In conclusion, the plaintiff's case was rejected by the judge as he submitted that the sovereignty of Ireland (re Article 5) provided state immunity. In her appeal to the Supreme Court, counsel for the plaintiff argued that the immunity enjoyed by the Crown did not survive the 1922 Constitution of the Irish Free State, and therefore the people (or the State) could not have inherited that royal prerogative.

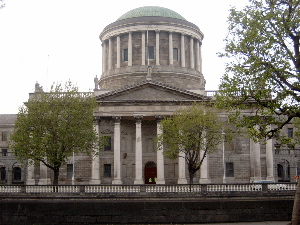
Four Courts Ireland's main Courts building

== The Supreme Court ==
The judgments came from Walsh J., Budd J. and (dissenting) Fitzgerald J. Walsh J. disagreed with the High Court judge's interpretation of Article 5 in the Constitution to support the argument that the State enjoyed immunity, with the implicit understanding that the state is above the law. The judge went on to say that the Constitution establishes the role of the Oireachtas to make laws and for the judiciary to administer the law and these roles of two organs of the state would not require the state to be above the law. Budd J. refers to Article 1 in the Constitution which enshrines the nation with the right to select a specific form of government; and asserts that Article 5 means that the Government is subject to the powers given to people in the constitution. Furthermore, Walsh J. states that it is not required that immunity from litigation should be an ingredient of being a sovereign state. Budd J. stated that the Constitution helps to provide rights and remedies for people, and that if the drafters of the constitution intended the state to have immunity, this would have been explicitly stated in the constitution, as can be seen in Article 13, relating to the immunity of the President. Budd J. asserts that as the king departed with the establishment of the Irish Constitution, any 'feudal' assumptions of legal immunity have also disappeared. Budd J. stated that if Ireland is a juristic person (as established in Comyn v Attorney General and Commissioner of Public Works v Kavanagh) then prima facie there would appear to be no reason why the state cannot be sued, as with any juristic person. Fitzgerald J. dissented from the judgment of the Supreme Court. In conclusion, the court found that the state could be sued and specified that the Attorney General was the appropriate party in such legal proceedings.

== Conclusion ==
This is a landmark case in Ireland, with the profound implication as stated by Osborough (1976): "The immunity of the State in tort had been given its quietus" and the concerns of the judge in the High Court about the risks of Ministers and their servants being held liable for errors indicates how significant the subsequent ruling in the Supreme Court was. Judicial acts would seem to be protected with immunity by common law rules and the constitution. The judgment in Byrne v Ireland and the Attorney General also reinforced and extended the existing tortious liability of the State relating to road accidents caused by agents of the state in publicly owned vehicles in the Civil Liability Act (1961). The historical context of the landmark decision is captured in Binchy's (2016) characterisation of it as marking the emerging nature of the Irish state as a servant of its people rather than a repository of sovereign rights and immunity inherent in the Crown.

== See also ==
- Law of the Republic of Ireland
- Supreme Court of Ireland
- High Court (Ireland)
