= PennEast Pipeline Co. v. New Jersey =

2021 United States Supreme Court decision

- Supreme Court of the United States

Argued April 28, 2021 Decided June 29, 2021
- Full case name: PennEast Pipeline Co., LLC v. New Jersey, et al.
- Docket no.: 19-1039
- Citations: 594 U.S. 482 (more) 141 S. Ct. 2244, 210 L. Ed. 2d 624

Holding
- Section 717f(h) of the Natural Gas Act of 1938 authorizes FERC certificate holders to condemn all necessary rights-of-way, whether owned by private parties or States.

Court membership
- Chief Justice John Roberts Associate Justices Clarence Thomas · Stephen Breyer; Samuel Alito · Sonia Sotomayor; Elena Kagan · Neil Gorsuch; Brett Kavanaugh · Amy Coney Barrett

Case opinions
- Majority: Roberts, joined by Breyer, Alito, Sotomayor, Kavanaugh
- Dissent: Gorsuch, joined by Thomas
- Dissent: Barrett, joined by Thomas, Kagan, Gorsuch

Laws applied
- Natural Gas Act of 1938

PennEast Pipeline Co. v. New Jersey, 594 U.S. 482 (2021), was a United States Supreme Court case dealing with the sovereign immunity of states to delegated powers of eminent domain granted to private companies from federal agencies, in the specific case, acquiring property for the right-of-way to build a natural gas pipeline. The Court, in a 5–4 decision issued in June 2021, ruled that states, by nature of ratifying the Constitution, gave up their ability to exercise sovereign immunity from the federal government or from those parties whom they have delegated that authority.

== Background ==
The PennEast Pipeline was proposed by the PennEast Pipeline Co., a consortium of five regional energy companies, to move up 1 million cubic feet (28,000 m^{3}) of natural gas from the Marcellus Shale formation in Pennsylvania to New Jersey over a distance of about 115 miles (185 km). As part of the approvals and permitting process, the consortium got approval from Federal Energy Regulatory Commission (FERC) for their proposed pipeline route in 2018. FERC's approval included the ability for PennEast to use eminent domain to obtain parcels of property along the route under terms of the Natural Gas Act of 1938 and its 1947 amendment to 15 U.S.C. §717f(e). This approval was met with numerous criticisms by New Jersey and other respondents, and a separate suit challenging the FERC's order was raised at the United States Court of Appeals for the District of Columbia Circuit.

As the case challenging the FERC order proceeded, PennEast began legal action to use the eminent domain power to acquire the land for the pipeline. About forty parcels of land were owned by the state of New Jersey and the New Jersey Conservation Foundation, and PennEast turned to court action to assert eminent domain. New Jersey requested these suits be dismissed on the basis of sovereign immunity, that the state should be immune from such a lawsuit by a private company. The United States District Court for the District of New Jersey denied the motion and allowed PennEast's suits to proceed. New Jersey appealed to the Third Circuit Court of Appeals, which reversed the District Court's ruling. The Third Circuit ruled that on the basis of the Eleventh Amendment to the United States Constitution, states did enjoy sovereign immunity from private lawsuits, blocking process of PennEast's suits.

== Supreme Court ==
PennEast petitioned to the Supreme Court for review of the Third Circuit's ruling. The D.C. Circuit placed the larger challenge to FERC's approval on abeyance while litigation in this case proceeded. The Supreme Court granted certiorari in February 2021, with oral arguments held on April 28, 2021.

The Court issued its decision on June 29, 2021. The 5–4 decision reversed the Third Circuit's ruling and remanded the case for further review. The majority opinion was written by Chief Justice John Roberts and joined by Justices Stephen Breyer, Samuel Alito, Sonia Sotomayor, and Brett Kavanaugh. Roberts stated on the matter of sovereign immunity, "Although nonconsenting States are generally immune from suit, they surrendered their immunity from the exercise of the federal eminent domain power when they ratified the Constitution." Thus, PennEast's lawsuits "do not offend state sovereignty, because the states consented at the founding to the exercise of the federal eminent domain power, whether by public officials or private delegatees".

Justice Neil Gorsuch wrote one dissenting opinion, which was joined by Justice Clarence Thomas. A second dissent was written by Amy Coney Barrett, and joined by Thomas, Elena Kagan and Gorsuch. In her dissent, Barrett wrote "Congress cannot circumvent state sovereign immunity’s limitations on the judicial power through its Article I powers. Thus, even in areas where Article I grants it 'complete lawmaking authority,' Congress lacks a tool that it could otherwise use to implement its power: 'authorization of suits by private parties against unconsenting States.'"

== Aftermath ==
Despite its victory in the Supreme Court, PennEast withdrew its eminent domain claims on New Jersey state land and canceled the pipeline project. PennEast announced this decision in September 2021, less than three months after the Supreme Court's ruling. The company cited regulatory hurdles, such as water quality and wetlands permits in New Jersey, as reasons for the cancellation.
