= Sovereign immunity =

Legal doctrine

Sovereign immunity, or crown immunity, is a legal doctrine whereby a sovereign or state cannot commit a legal wrong and is immune from civil suit or criminal prosecution, strictly speaking in modern texts in its own courts. State immunity is a similar, stronger doctrine, that applies to foreign courts.

== History ==
Sovereign immunity is the original forebear of state immunity based on the classical concept of sovereignty in the sense that a sovereign could not be subjected without their approval to the jurisdiction of another. In constitutional monarchies, the sovereign is the historical origin of the authority which creates the courts. Thus the courts had no power to compel the sovereign to be bound by them as they were created by the sovereign for the protection of their subjects. This rule was commonly expressed by the popular legal maxim rex non potest peccare, meaning "the king can do no wrong".

== Forms ==
There are two forms of sovereign immunity:

- immunity from suit (also known as immunity from jurisdiction or adjudication)
- immunity from enforcement.

Immunity from suit means that neither a sovereign/head of state in person nor any in absentia or representative form (nor to a lesser extent the state) can be a defendant or subject of court proceedings, nor in most equivalent forums such as under arbitration awards and tribunal awards/damages.

Immunity from enforcement means that even if a person succeeds in any way against their sovereign or state, they and the judgment may find themselves without means of enforcement. Separation of powers or natural justice coupled with a political status other than a totalitarian state dictates there be broad exceptions to immunity such as statutes which expressly bind the state (a prime example being constitutional laws) and judicial review.

== Waiver ==
Sovereign immunity of a state entity may be waived. A state entity may waive its immunity by:

- prior written agreement
- instituting proceedings without claiming immunity
- submitting to jurisdiction as a defendant in a suit
- intervening in or taking any steps in any suit (other than for the purpose of claiming immunity).

== By country ==
=== Australia ===
There is no automatic Crown immunity in Australia, and the Australian Constitution does not establish a state of unfettered immunity of the Crown in respect of the states and the Commonwealth. The Constitution of Australia establishes matters on which the states and the Commonwealth legislate independently of each other; in practice this means the states legislate on some things and the Commonwealth legislates on others. In some circumstances, this can create ambiguity as to the applicability of legislation where there is no clearly established Crown immunity. The Australian Constitution does however, in s. 109, declare that, "When a law of a State is inconsistent with a law of the Commonwealth, the latter shall prevail, and the former shall, to the extent of the inconsistency, be invalid." Based on this, depending on the context of application and whether a particular statute infringes on the executive powers of the state or the Commonwealth the Crown may or may not be immune from any particular statute.

Many Acts passed in Australia, both at the state and at the federal level, contain a section declaring whether the Act binds the Crown, and, if so, in what respect:

- Commonwealth Acts may contain wording similar to: "This Act binds the Crown in each of its capacities", or specify a more restricted application.
- State acts may contain wording similar to: "This Act binds the Crown in right of [the state] and, in so far as the legislative power of the Parliament of [the state] permits, the Crown in all its other capacities."

While there is no ambiguity about the first aspect of this declaration about binding the Crown with respect to the state in question, there have been several cases about the interpretation of the second aspect extending it to the Crown in its other capacities. Rulings by the High Court of Australia on specific matters of conflict between the application of states laws on Commonwealth agencies have provided the interpretation that the Crown in all of its other capacities includes the Commonwealth, therefore if a state Act contains this text then the Act may bind the Commonwealth, subject to the s. 109 test of inconsistency.

A landmark case which set a precedent for challenging broad Crown immunity and established tests for the applicability of state laws on the Commonwealth was Henderson v Defence Housing Authority in 1997. This case involved the arbitration of a dispute between Mr. Henderson and the Defence Housing Authority (DHA). Mr. Henderson owned a house which the DHA had leased to provide housing to members of the Australian Defence Force (ADF). Under the NSW Residential Tenancies Act 1997, Mr. Henderson sought orders from the Residential Tenancies Tribunal to enter the premises for the purposes of conducting inspections. In response, DHA claimed that as a Commonwealth agency the legislation of NSW did not apply to it and further sought writs of prohibition attempting to restrain Mr. Henderson from pursuing the matter further. Up until this point the Commonwealth and its agencies claimed an unfettered immunity from state legislation and had used s. 109 to justify this position, specifically that the NSW Act was in conflict with the Act which created the DHA and s. 109 of the constitution applied. Mr. Henderson took the case to the High Court and a panel of seven justices to arbitrate the matter. By a majority decision of six to one the court ruled that the DHA was bound by the NSW Act on the basis that the NSW Act did not limit, deny or restrict the activities of the DHA but sought to regulate them, an important distinction which was further explained in the rulings of several of the justices. It was ruled that the NSW Act was one of general application and therefore the Crown (in respect of the Commonwealth) could not be immune from it, citing other cases in which the same ruling had been made and that it was contrary to the rule of law. As a result of this case, the Commonwealth cannot claim a broad constitutional immunity from state legislation.

In practice, three tests have been developed to determine whether a state law applies to the Commonwealth and vice versa:

1. Does the law seek to merely regulate the activities of the Commonwealth as opposed to deny, restrict or limit them?
2. Is the state law constructed such that the act binds the Crown in respect of all of its capacities?
3. Is there no inconsistency between a state law and a Commonwealth law on the same matter?

If these three tests are satisfied, then the Act binds the Crown in respect of the Commonwealth. In Australia, there is no clear automatic Crown immunity or lack of it; as such there is a rebuttable presumption that the Crown is not bound by a statute, as noted in Bropho v State of Western Australia. The Crown's immunity may also apply to other parties in certain circumstances, as held in Australian Competition and Consumer Commission v Baxter Healthcare.

=== Belgium ===
Article 88 of the Constitution of Belgium states: "The King's person is inviolable; his ministers are accountable."

=== Bhutan ===
According to the constitution of Bhutan, the monarch is not answerable in a court of law for their actions.

=== Canada ===
Canada inherited the common law version of Crown immunity from British law. However, over time, the scope of Crown immunity has been steadily reduced by statute law. As of 1994, section 14 of Alberta's Interpretation Act states, "no enactment is binding on His Majesty or affects His Majesty or His Majesty's rights or prerogatives in any manner, unless the enactment expressly states that it binds His Majesty." However, in more recent times "all Canadian provinces ... and the federal government (the Crown Liability Act) have now rectified this anomaly by passing legislation which leaves the Crown liable in tort as a normal person would be. Thus, the tort liability of the government is a relatively new development in Canada, statute-based, and is not a fruit of common law."

Since 1918, it has been held that provincial legislatures cannot bind the federal Crown, as Charles Fitzpatrick noted in Gauthier v The King: "Provincial legislation cannot proprio vigore [i.e., of its own force] take away or abridge any privilege of the Crown in right of the Dominion."

It has also been a constitutional convention that the Crown in right of each province is immune from the jurisdiction of the courts in other provinces. However, this is now in question.

Lieutenant governors do not enjoy the same immunity as the sovereign in matters not relating to the powers of the office. In 2013, the Supreme Court refused to hear the request of former Lieutenant Governor of Quebec Lise Thibault to have charges against her dropped. She was being prosecuted by the Attorney General of Quebec for misappropriation of public funds, but invoked royal immunity on the basis that "the Queen can do no wrong". As per convention, the court did not disclose its reasons for not considering the matter. Thibault later petitioned the Court of Quebec for the same motives. Judge St-Cyr again rejected her demand, noting that constitutional law does not grant a lieutenant governor the same benefits as the monarch and that, in her case, royal immunity would only apply to actions involving official state functions, not personal ones. She was eventually found guilty and sentenced to 18 months in jail, but was granted conditional release after serving six months.

=== China ===
China historically adhered to the doctrine of absolute sovereign immunity, under which states and their property enjoy immunity from the jurisdiction of foreign courts regardless of the nature of the act. This position was based on the principle that all states are equal and therefore cannot exercise jurisdiction over one another. Chinese state-owned enterprises considered instrumental to the state, such as the Aviation Industry Corporation of China (AVIC) and China National Building Material, have claimed sovereign immunity in lawsuits brought against them in foreign courts, with the support of the Chinese government.

On September 1, 2023, China's Standing Committee of the National People's Congress passed the Foreign State Immunity Law, marking a fundamental shift from absolute to restrictive sovereign immunity. The law came into effect on January 1, 2024. Under the new legal framework, foreign states no longer enjoy immunity in proceedings arising from commercial activities, and the law establishes exceptions for torts, employment contracts, and arbitration-related matters.

==== Hong Kong ====
In 2011, the Hong Kong Court of Final Appeal ruled that absolute sovereign immunity applies in Hong Kong, as the Court found that Hong Kong, as a Special Administrative Region of China, could not have policies on state immunity that were inconsistent with China. The ruling was an outcome of the Democratic Republic of the Congo v FG Hemisphere Associates case in 2011.

Following the enactment of the Foreign State Immunity Law in 2023, the same restrictive immunity regime now applies in Hong Kong. The Hong Kong Court of Final Appeal's decision in Congo was predicated on China's absolute immunity stance, and the subsequent national legislation supersedes that position. As such, restrictive immunity applies in Hong Kong.

===== Democratic Republic of the Congo v FG Hemisphere Associates (2011) =====
The Democratic Republic of the Congo and its state-owned electricity company Société nationale d'électricité (SNEL) defaulted on payments of a debt owed to an energy company, Energoinvest. During arbitration, Energoinvest was awarded damages against the Congolese government and SNEL. This was reassigned by Energoinvest to FG Hemisphere Associates LLC.

FG Hemisphere subsequently learned that the Congolese government entered into a separate joint venture with Chinese companies later, in which the Congolese government would be paid US$221 million in mining entry fees. As a result, FG Hemisphere applied to collect these fees in order to enforce the earlier arbitral award. The Congolese government asserted sovereign immunity in the legal proceedings. This was eventually brought to the Hong Kong Court of Final Appeal, when the Congolese government fought to overturn an earlier Court of Appeal decision which had ruled that:

- as restrictive sovereign immunity applied in Hong Kong, the Congolese government had no immunity in commercial proceedings.
- if absolute sovereign immunity had applied in Hong Kong, the Congolese government had waived their sovereign immunity rights in this case.

The Hong Kong Court of Final Appeal ruled 3:2 that the Congolese government had not waived its immunity in the Hong Kong courts, and that as a Special Administrative Region of China, Hong Kong could not have policies on state immunity that were inconsistent with China's. Therefore, the doctrine of sovereign immunity applied in Hong Kong should be absolute, and may be invoked when jurisdiction is sought in the foreign court in relation to an application to enforce a foreign judgment or arbitral award, or when execution is sought against assets in the foreign state. This means that sovereign states are absolutely immune to the jurisdiction of Hong Kong courts, including in commercial claims, unless the state waives its immunity. In order to waive immunity, there must be express, unequivocal submission to the jurisdiction of the Hong Kong courts "in the face of the court". Claimants should establish that the state party has waived their entitlement to immunity at the relevant stage, before proceedings can occur in court.

=== Denmark ===
Article 13 of the Constitution of Denmark states:

The King shall not be answerable for his actions; his person shall be sacrosanct. The Ministers shall be responsible for the conduct of the government; their responsibility shall be determined by Statute.

Accordingly, the monarch cannot be sued in their personal capacity. On the other hand, this immunity from lawsuits does not extend to the state as such and article 63 explicitly authorises the courts to judge the executive authority: "The courts of justice shall be empowered to decide any question relating to the scope of the executive's authority; though any person wishing to question such authority shall not, by taking the case to the courts of justice, avoid temporary compliance with orders given by the executive authority." Furthermore, no other member of the royal family can be prosecuted for any crime under Article 25 of the old absolutist constitution Lex Regia (The King's Law), currently still valid, which states: "They shall answer to no magistrate judges, but their first and last Judge shall be the King, or to whom He to that decrees."

=== Finland ===
The President of Finland has immunity from prosecution according to Article 113 of the Constitution, which applies to their official activities. If the president is suspected of treason or a crime against humanity in the course of their official duties, the parliament can, with a 3/4 majority, decide to bring charges to the national court. The president cannot be charged for other crimes committed in the performance of their duties, but may remain accountable for acts committed outside of their office in the same way as other citizens.

=== Holy See ===
The Holy See, the jurisdiction of the Catholic Church of which the pope is head (often referred to by metonymy as the Vatican or Vatican City State, a distinct entity), claims sovereign immunity for the pope, supported by many international agreements.

=== Iceland ===
According to article 11 of the Constitution of Iceland the president can only be held accountable and be prosecuted with the consent of parliament.

=== India ===
According to Article 361 of the Constitution of India no legal action in the court of law can be taken against President of India and the governors of states of India as long as that person is holding either office. However, they can be impeached and then sued for their actions.

=== Ireland ===
In Byrne v. Ireland, the Supreme Court of Ireland declared that sovereign immunity had not survived the creation of the Irish Free State in 1922, and that accordingly the state could be sued for and held vicariously liable for the acts and omissions of its servants and agents.

=== Italy ===
According to the Constitution, a President of the Italian Republic is not accountable, and is not responsible for any act of their office, unless they have committed high treason or attempted to subvert the Constitution, as stated in Article 90:

The President of the Republic is not responsible for the actions performed in the exercise of his functions, except in the cases of high treason or attempt against the Constitution. In such cases, he may be impeached by Parliament in joint session, with an absolute majority of its members.

The Italian Penal Code makes it a criminal offence to insult the honor and prestige of the President (Art. 278), and until 2006 it was an offence to publicly give the President responsibility for actions of the Government (Art. 279 – abrogated).

=== Japan ===
Article 17 of the Constitution of Japan states: "Every person may sue for redress as provided by law from the State or a public entity, in case he has suffered damage through illegal act of any public official." The State Redress Act (国家賠償法, kokka baishōhō) was made according to this article. Officials who commit torts themselves are not liable, although the State or a public entity has the right to obtain reimbursement from the officers if there is intent or gross negligence on the part of them. The Administrative Litigation Act enables the people to file lawsuits involving the government of Japan.

On November 20, 1989, the Supreme Court ruled that it does not have judicial power over the Emperor because he is "the symbol of the State and of the unity of the people".

=== Malaysia ===
In Malaysia, a amendment to the constitution in 1993 during the premiership of Mahathir Mohamad abolished royal immunity from prosecution, allowing both the king and state rulers to be tried in a Special Court. This was previously impossible because every ruler of Malaysia was stated to be protected from being brought to court due to their royal status.

=== Netherlands ===
Since 1848, article 42 of the Dutch constitution states: "The king is immune from prosecution; the ministers are responsible".

=== Nigeria ===
Section 308 of the Nigerian constitution of 1999 provides immunity from court proceedings, i.e., proceedings that will compel their attendance in favour of elected executive officers, namely the President and his vice and the governors of the states and the deputies. This immunity extends to acts done in their official capacities so that they are not responsible for acts done on behalf of the state. However, this immunity does not extend to acts done in abuse of the powers of their office of which they are liable upon the expiration of their tenure. The judiciary has absolute immunity for actions decisions taken in their official capacity.

=== Norway ===
Article 5 of the Constitution of Norway states: "The King's person is sacred; he cannot be censured or accused. The responsibility rests with his Council." Accordingly, the monarch cannot be prosecuted or sued in their personal capacity, but this immunity does not extend to the state as such. Neither does immunity extend to the monarch in his capacity as an owner or stakeholder in real property, or as an employer, provided that the suit does not allege personal responsibility for the monarch.

=== Philippines ===
Article XVI, Section 3 of the 1987 Constitution currently in force states: "The State may not be sued without its consent."

=== Spain ===
The Spanish monarch is personally immune from prosecution for acts committed by government ministers in their name, according to Title II, Section 56, Subsection 3 of the Spanish Constitution of 1978.

The person of the King is inviolable and shall not be held accountable. His acts shall always be countersigned in the manner established in section 64. Without such countersignature they shall not be valid, except as provided under section 65(2).

The constitution did not state whether a monarch who abdicated retains legal immunity, prior to the abdication of Juan Carlos I in 2014, but the government was planning to make changes to allow this. Legislation was passed, although unlike his previous immunity, the new legislation did not completely shield Juan Carlos, who was obliged to answer to the Supreme Court in a similar type of protection afforded to many high-ranking civil servants and politicians in Spain. The legislation stipulated that all outstanding legal matters relating to the former king be suspended and passed "immediately" to the Supreme Court.

=== Sri Lanka ===
By the Constitution of Sri Lanka, a sitting president of Sri Lanka has sovereign immunity.

=== Sweden ===
Chapter 5, Article 8 of the Swedish Constitution states: "The King or Queen who is Head of State cannot be prosecuted for his or her actions. Nor can a Regent be prosecuted for his or her actions as Head of State." This only concerns the monarch as a private person, since they do not appoint the government nor do any public officials act in their name. It does not concern other members of the Swedish royal family, except in such cases as they are exercising the office of regent when the monarch is unable to serve. It is a disputed matter among Swedish constitutional lawyers whether the article also implies that the monarch is immune from lawsuits in civil cases which do not involve prosecution.

=== Singapore ===
In Singapore, state immunities are codified in the State Immunity Act of 1979, which closely resembles the United Kingdom's State Immunity Act 1978. Singapore's State Immunity Act has phrases identical to that of Section 9 of United Kingdom's State Immunity Act, and does not allow a foreign state, which has agreed to submit a dispute to arbitration, to claim jurisdictional immunity in judicial proceedings relating to the agreed arbitration, i.e. "where a State has agreed in writing to submit a dispute which has arisen, or may arise, to arbitration, the state is not immune as respects proceedings in the courts in Singapore which relate to the arbitration".

The President of Singapore does to a certain extent have sovereign immunity subjected to clause 22K(4).

=== United Kingdom ===
==== Immunity in proceedings ====
Historically, the general rule in the United Kingdom has been that the Crown has never been liable to be prosecuted or proceeded against in either criminal or civil cases. The only means by which civil proceedings could be brought were:

- by way of petition of right, which was dependent on the grant of the royal fiat (i.e. permission);
- by suits against the Attorney General for a declaration; or
- by actions against ministers or government departments where an Act of Parliament had specifically provided that immunity be waived.

The position was drastically altered by the Crown Proceedings Act 1947 which made the Crown (when acting as the government) liable as of right in proceedings where it was previously only liable by virtue of a grant of a fiat. With limited exceptions, this had the effect of allowing proceedings for tort and contract to be brought against the Crown. Proceedings to bring writs of mandamus and prohibition were always available against ministers, because their actions derive from the royal prerogative.

Criminal proceedings are still prohibited from being brought against His Majesty's Government unless expressly permitted by the Crown Proceedings Act.

As the Crown Proceedings Act only affected the law in respect of acts carried on by or on behalf of the British government, the monarch remains personally immune from criminal and civil actions. However, civil proceedings can, in theory, still be brought using the two original mechanisms outlined above – by petition of right or by suit against the Attorney General for a declaration.

==== Other immunities ====
The monarch is immune to arrest in all cases; members of the royal household are immune from arrest in civil proceedings. No arrest can be made "in the monarch's presence", or within the "verges" of a royal palace. When a royal palace is used as a residence (regardless of whether the monarch is actually living there at the time), judicial processes cannot be executed within that palace.

The monarch's goods cannot be taken under a writ of execution, nor can distress be levied on land in his/her possession. Chattels owned by the Crown, but present on another's land, cannot be taken in execution or for distress. The Crown is not subject to foreclosure.

As of 2022, there were more than 160 laws granting express immunity to the monarch or his/her property in some respects. For instance, employees of the monarchy cannot pursue anti-discrimination complaints such as those under the Equality Act 2010. The monarchy is exempt from numerous other workers' rights, health and safety, or pensions laws. Government employees such as environmental inspectors are banned from entering the monarch's property without his/her permission. The monarch is also exempt from numerous taxes, although Queen Elizabeth II did pay some taxes voluntarily. Some of the odder exceptions for the monarch are included in laws against private persons setting off nuclear explosions, or regulating the sale of alcohol after midnight.

=== United States ===
In United States law, state, federal, and tribal governments generally enjoy immunity from lawsuits. Local governments typically enjoy immunity from some forms of suit, particularly in tort.

In the US, sovereign immunity falls into two categories:

- Absolute immunity: pursuant to which a government actor may not be sued for the allegedly wrongful act, even if that person acted maliciously or in bad faith; and
- Qualified immunity: pursuant to which a government actor is shielded from liability only if specific conditions are met, as specified in statute or case law.

In some situations, sovereign immunity may have been waived by law, for example allowing lawsuits to enforce constitutional rights (such as requiring compensation for seized property) or specific legal requirements (like government projects that must perform environmental studies). This permits lawsuits against the government as a legal person, or against specific government officials in their official capacity (meaning they are not personally liable, but they are named in lawsuits, and the next occupant of the office would inherit the lawsuit).

Government employees as individuals may be covered by either type, depending on their function. Police generally enjoy qualified immunity; judicial immunity is a specific form of absolute immunity that applies to judges.

==== Federal sovereign immunity ====
The federal government of the United States has sovereign immunity and may not be sued anywhere in the United States unless it has waived its immunity or consented to suit. The United States has waived sovereign immunity to a limited extent, mainly through the Federal Tort Claims Act, which waives the immunity if a tortious act of a federal employee causes damage, and the Tucker Act, which waives the immunity over claims arising out of contracts to which the federal government is a party. As a sovereign, the United States is immune from suit unless it unequivocally consents to being sued. The United States Supreme Court in Price v. United States and Osage Indians observed: "It is an axiom of our jurisprudence. The government is not liable to suit unless it consents thereto, and its liability in suit cannot be extended beyond the plain language of the statute authorizing it."

==== State sovereign immunity ====
In Hans v. Louisiana (1890), the Supreme Court of the United States held that the Eleventh Amendment (1795) re-affirms that states possess sovereign immunity and are therefore generally immune from being sued in federal court without their consent. In later cases, the Supreme Court has strengthened state sovereign immunity considerably. In Blatchford v. Native Village of Noatak (1991), the court explained that

we have understood the Eleventh Amendment to stand not so much for what it says, but for the presupposition of our constitutional structure which it confirms: that the States entered the federal system with their sovereignty intact; that the judicial authority in Article III is limited by this sovereignty, . . . and that a State will therefore not be subject to suit in federal court unless it has consented to suit, either expressly or in the "plan of the convention."

In Alden v. Maine (1999), the Court explained that while it has

sometimes referred to the States' immunity from suit as "Eleventh Amendment immunity"[,] [that] phrase is [a] convenient shorthand but something of a misnomer, for the sovereign immunity of the States neither derives from, nor is limited by, the terms of the Eleventh Amendment. Rather, as the Constitution's structure, its history, and the authoritative interpretations by this Court make clear, the States' immunity from suit is a fundamental aspect of the sovereignty which the States enjoyed before the ratification of the Constitution, and which they retain today (either literally or by virtue of their admission into the Union upon an equal footing with the other States) except as altered by the plan of the Convention or certain constitutional Amendments.

Writing for the Court in Alden, Justice Anthony Kennedy argued that in view of this, and given the limited nature of congressional power delegated by the original unamended Constitution, the court could not "conclude that the specific Article I powers delegated to Congress necessarily include, by virtue of the Necessary and Proper Clause or otherwise, the incidental authority to subject the States to private suits as a means of achieving objectives otherwise within the scope of the enumerated powers."

However, other cases have determined that a "consequence of [the] Court's recognition of preratification sovereignty as the source of immunity from suit is that only States and arms of the State possess immunity from suits authorized by federal law". Thus, cities and municipalities lack sovereign immunity. Counties are not generally considered to have sovereign immunity, even when they "exercise a 'slice of state power,'" nor are school districts.

Additionally, Congress can abrogate state sovereign immunity when it acts pursuant to powers delegated to it by any amendments ratified after the Eleventh Amendment. The abrogation doctrine, established by the Supreme Court in Fitzpatrick v. Bitzer (1976), is most often implicated in cases that involve Section 5 of the Fourteenth Amendment, which explicitly allows Congress to enforce its guarantees on the states.

== See also ==
- Absolute immunity
- Command responsibility
- Diplomatic immunity
- Immunity (disambiguation) § Law
- Impeachment
- Jurisdiction
- Parliamentary immunity
- Qualified immunity
- State liability
