= Alden v. Maine =

- Supreme Court of the United States

Argued March 31, 1999 Decided June 23, 1999
- Full case name: Alden et al. v. Maine
- Citations: 527 U.S. 706 (more) 119 S. Ct. 2240; 144 L. Ed. 2d 636

Case history
- Prior: Certiorari to the Supreme Judicial Court of Maine

Holding
- Article I of the United States Constitution does not provide Congress with the ability to subject nonconsenting states to private suits for damages in its own courts.

Court membership
- Chief Justice William Rehnquist Associate Justices John P. Stevens · Sandra Day O'Connor; Antonin Scalia · Anthony Kennedy; David Souter · Clarence Thomas; Ruth Bader Ginsburg · Stephen Breyer

Case opinions
- Majority: Kennedy, joined by Rehnquist, O'Connor, Scalia, Thomas
- Dissent: Souter, joined by Stevens, Ginsburg, Breyer

Laws applied
- U.S. Const. arts. I, § 8, III, § 2 U.S. Const. amend. XI

Alden v. Maine, 527 U.S. 706 (1999), was a United States Supreme Court case in which the Court held that the United States Congress may not use its Article One powers to allow people to sue a state in that state's own courts without the state's consent. It thereby expanded the sovereign immunity that the states enjoyed.

== Background ==
In 1992, probation officers employed by Maine filed a suit against their employer in United States District Court for the District of Maine, alleging violations of the overtime provisions laid out in the federal Fair Labor Standards Act (FLSA), and requesting liquidated damages and compensation. The court dismissed the suit, stating that the Eleventh Amendment gave the states sovereign immunity from suit in federal court. After the dismissal, the officers filed the same action in Maine state court, which also dismissed the case on grounds of sovereign immunity. The case was then appealed to the Maine appellate courts, which upheld the state trial court's decision, and then to the Supreme Court.

== Opinion of the Court ==
Justice Anthony Kennedy authored a 5–4 majority opinion joined by Chief Justice William Rehnquist and Justices Sandra Day O'Connor, Antonin Scalia, and Clarence Thomas. Kennedy concluded that Article One of the Constitution did not provide Congress with the ability to subject nonconsenting states to private suits for damages in its own courts. He therefore upheld the ruling of the Supreme Court of Maine on the grounds that Maine was not a consenting party in the suit.

Kennedy held that sovereign immunity for states against suits by their own citizens in their own courts was necessary to maintain state sovereignty, which lay at the heart of federalism. He wrote that "sovereign immunity derives not from the Eleventh Amendment but from the federal structure of the original Constitution itself."

After discussing the Eleventh Amendment, Kennedy turned to the question of whether Congress had the Article One authority to subject nonconsenting states to private suits in their own courts. He ruled that Congress had no such authority to abrogate states' sovereign immunity:

Nor can we conclude that the specific Article I powers delegated to Congress necessarily include, by virtue of the Necessary and Proper Clause or otherwise, the incidental authority to subject the States to private suits as a means of achieving objectives otherwise within the scope of the enumerated powers.

Kennedy wrote that the Supremacy Clause of the Constitution applied only to pieces of legislation that fit within its design. Therefore, any law passed by Congress pursuant to Article One that sought to subject states to suit would violate the Constitution. However, he stated that Congress may abrogate state sovereign immunity to pass legislation that enforces the Fourteenth Amendment:

We have held also that in adopting the Fourteenth Amendment, the people required the States to surrender a portion of the sovereignty that had been preserved. ... Congress may authorize private suits against nonconsenting States pursuant to its §5 enforcement power. Fitzpatrick v. Bitzer, 427 U. S. 445 (1976). ... When Congress enacts appropriate legislation to enforce this Amendment, see City of Boerne v. Flores, 521 U. S. 507 (1997), federal interests are paramount, and Congress may assert an authority over the States which would be otherwise unauthorized by the Constitution.

== Dissent ==
Justice David Souter dissented, joined by Justices John Paul Stevens, Ruth Bader Ginsburg, and Stephen Breyer. Souter argued that the concept of sovereign immunity had been misapplied by the majority on the basis that the idea of sovereign immunity was unclear during the period of the Constitution's ratification and the Founding Framers would have not expected the idea to remain static over numerous years. He also stated that the FLSA was national in scope and so did not violate the principle of federalism, as had been argued by Justice Kennedy.

Souter argued that the claim that the FLSA was unconstitutional was spurious. He wrote that such thinking could be reached only based upon the notions of sovereign immunity and federalism that the majority had used, which he characterized as misguided and not historically grounded:

So there is much irony in the Court's profession that it grounds its opinion on a deeply rooted historical tradition of sovereign immunity, when the Court abandons a principle nearly as inveterate, and much closer to the hearts of the Framers: that where there is a right, there must be a remedy. Lord Chief Justice Holt could state this as an unquestioned proposition already in 1702, as he did in Ashby v. White, 6 Mod. 45, 53-54, 87 Eng. Rep. 808, 815 (K.B.):

"If an Act of Parliament be made for the benefit of any person, and he is hindered by another of that benefit, by necessary consequence of law he shall have an action; and the current of all the books is so." Ibid. (citation omitted). (Note: The principle is even older with respect to rights created by statute, like the FLSA rights here, than it is for common-law damages. Lord Holt in fact argued that the well-established principle in the context of statutory rights applied to common law rights as well. See Ashby v. White, 6 Mod., at 54, 87 Eng. Rep., at 816 ("Now if this be so in case of an Act of Parliament, why shall not common law be so too? For sure the common law is as forcible as any Act of Parliament"). A still older formulation of the statutory right appears in a note in Coke's Reports: "[W]hen any thing is prohibited by an Act, although that the Act doth not give an action, yet action lieth upon it." 12 Co. Rep. 100. Coke's Institutes yield a similar statement: "When any act doth prohibit any wrong or vexation, though no action be particularly named in the act, yet the party grieved shall have an action grounded upon this statute." 1 E. Coke, The Second Part of the Institutes of the Laws of England 117 (1797) (reprinted in 5B 2d Historical Writings in Law and Jurisprudence (1986)). In our case, of course, the statute expressly gives an action.)

Blackstone considered it "a general and indisputable rule, that where there is a legal right, there is also a legal remedy, by suit or action at law, whenever that right is invaded." 3 Blackstone *23. The generation of the Framers thought the principle so crucial that several States put it into their constitutions. (Note: See, e.g., A Declaration of Rights and Fundamental Rules of the Delaware State § 12 (1776), 2 Sources and Documents of United States Constitutions, at 197, 198; Md. Const. Art. XVII (1776), 4 id., at 372, 373; Mass. Const. Art. XI, (1780), 5 id., at 92, 94; Ky. Const. Art. XII, cl. 13 (1792), 4 id., at 142, 150; Tenn. Const. Art. XI, § 7 (1796), 9 id., at 141, 148.) And when Chief Justice Marshall asked about Marbury, "If he has a right, and that right has been violated, do the laws of his country afford him a remedy?," Marbury v. Madison, 1 Cranch 137, 162 (1803), the question was rhetorical, and the answer clear:

"The very essence of civil liberty certainly consists in the right of every individual to claim the protection of the laws, whenever he receives an injury. One of the first duties of government is to afford that protection. In Great Britain the king himself is sued in the respectful form of a petition, and he never fails to comply with the judgment of his court." Id., at 163.

Yet today the Court has no qualms about saying frankly that the federal right to damages afforded by Congress under the FLSA cannot create a concomitant private remedy.

== Analysis ==
Alden represented an extension of the court's 1996 ruling in Seminole Tribe v. Florida, which held that Congress cannot use its powers under Article One of the Constitution to subject nonconsenting states to suit in federal court, it its holding that Congress cannot use its Article One powers to subject nonconsenting states to suit in state court. Later, in Central Virginia Community College v. Katz (2006), the court narrowed the scope of its previous sovereign immunity rulings and held that Congress could use the Bankruptcy Clause of Article One to abrogate state sovereign immunity.

== Sources ==
- Chemerinsky, Erwin (1999), "The Hypocrisy of Alden v. Maine: Judicial Review, Sovereign Immunity and the Rehnquist Court", Loyola of Los Angeles Law Review, 33 (4): 1283–1308
- Marshall, William P.; Cowart, Jason S. (1999), "State Immunity, Political Accountability, and Alden v. Maine", Notre Dame Law Review, 75: 1069
- Young, Ernest A. (1999), "Alden v. Maine and the Jurisprudence of Structure", William & Mary Law Review, 41: 1601
- Tidmarsh, Jay (1999), "A Dialogic Defense of Alden", Notre Dame L. Rev., 75: 1161
