= Eleventh Amendment to the United States Constitution =

1795 amendment restricting ability to sue states in federal courts

The Eleventh Amendment (Amendment XI) is an amendment to the United States Constitution passed by Congress on March 4, 1794, and ratified by the states on February 7, 1795. The amendment restricts the ability of individuals to bring suit against states of which they are not citizens in federal court.

The Eleventh Amendment was adopted to overrule the Supreme Court's decision in Chisholm v. Georgia (1793). In that case, the Court held that states did not enjoy sovereign immunity from suits made by citizens of other states in federal court. Although the amendment established that federal courts did not have the authority to hear cases brought by private parties against a state of which they are not citizens, the Supreme Court has ruled that the amendment applies to all federal suits against states brought by private parties. The Supreme Court has also held that Congress can abrogate state sovereign immunity when using its authority under Section 5 of the Fourteenth Amendment. Other recent cases, including Central Virginia Community College v. Katz (2006), PennEast Pipeline Co. v. New Jersey (2021), and Torres v. Texas Department of Public Safety (2022), have identified further exceptions to the general sovereign immunity of states when Congress acts pursuant to its Article One powers, which have alternatively been referred to as "waivers in the plan of the Convention". The Supreme Court has also held that federal courts can enjoin state officials from violating federal law.

== Text ==
The Judicial power of the United States shall not be construed to extend to any suit in law or equity, commenced or prosecuted against one of the United States by Citizens of another State, or by Citizens or Subjects of any Foreign State.

== Background ==
The Eleventh Amendment was the first constitutional amendment adopted following the Bill of Rights. The amendment was adopted following the Supreme Court's ruling in Chisholm v. Georgia, (1793). In Chisholm, the Court ruled that federal courts had the authority to hear cases in law and equity brought by private citizens against states and that states did not enjoy sovereign immunity from suits made by citizens of other states in federal court. The amendment therefore restricted Article Three, Section 2 of the Constitution, which gave diversity jurisdiction to the judiciary to hear cases "between a state and citizens of another state."

== Proposal and ratification ==
The Eleventh Amendment was proposed by the 3rd Congress on March 4, 1794, when it was approved by the House of Representatives by vote of 81–9, having been previously passed by the Senate, 23–2, on January 14, 1794. The amendment was ratified by the state legislatures of the following states:

1. New York: March 27, 1794
2. Rhode Island: March 31, 1794
3. Connecticut: May 8, 1794
4. New Hampshire: June 16, 1794
5. Massachusetts: June 26, 1794
6. Vermont: November 9, 1794
7. Virginia: November 18, 1794
8. Georgia: November 29, 1794
9. Kentucky: December 7, 1794
10. Maryland: December 26, 1794
11. Delaware: January 23, 1795
12. North Carolina: February 7, 1795

There were fifteen states at the time, so ratification by twelve added the amendment to the Constitution.

The following states subsequently post-ratified it:

13. South Carolina: December 4, 1797.
14. New Jersey: June 25, 2018

On January 8, 1798, approximately three years after the amendment's actual adoption, President John Adams stated in a message to Congress that it had been ratified by the necessary number of states and had become a part of the Constitution. New Jersey and Pennsylvania did not take action on the amendment during that era; neither did Tennessee, which had become the 16th state on June 1, 1796 (this did not change the required number of votes to ratify the amendment). However, on June 25, 2018, the New Jersey Senate adopted Senate Concurrent Resolution No. 75 to ratify the amendment, making Pennsylvania the only state never to have ratified it.

== Impact ==
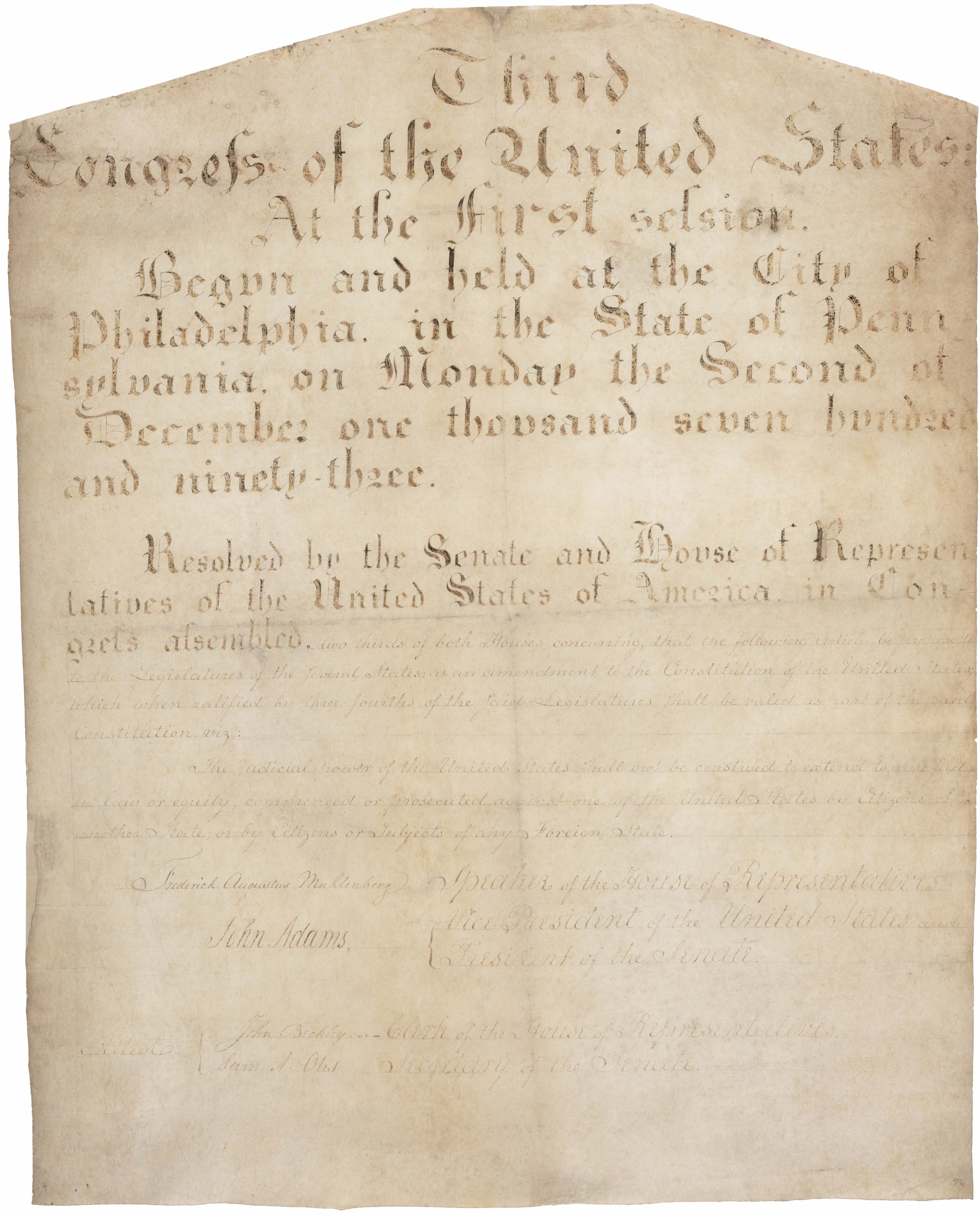
The Eleventh Amendment in the National Archives

Almost exactly three years after its ratification, the Supreme Court decision in Hollingsworth v. Virginia, 3 U.S. 378 (1798) resulted in every pending action brought under Chisholm being dismissed due to the amendment's adoption.

=== Sovereign immunity ===
The amendment's text does not mention suits brought against a state by its own citizens. However, in Hans v. Louisiana, 134 U.S. 1 (1890), the Supreme Court ruled that the amendment reflects a broader principle of sovereign immunity. As Justice Anthony Kennedy later stated in Alden v. Maine, 527 U.S. 706 (1999):

[S]overeign immunity derives not from the Eleventh Amendment but from the structure of the original Constitution itself. ... Nor can we conclude that the specific Article I powers delegated to Congress necessarily include, by virtue of the Necessary and Proper Clause or otherwise, the incidental authority to subject the States to private suits as a means of achieving objectives otherwise within the scope of the enumerated powers.

However, Justice David Souter, writing for a four-Justice dissent in Alden, said that the states surrendered their sovereign immunity when they ratified the Constitution. He read the amendment's text as reflecting a narrow form of sovereign immunity that only limited the diversity jurisdiction of the federal courts. He concluded that neither the Eleventh Amendment in particular nor the Constitution in general broadly insulated states from suits by individuals.

=== Application to federal law ===
Although the Eleventh Amendment grants immunity to states from suit for money damages or equitable relief without their consent, in Ex parte Young, 209 U.S. 123 (1908), the Supreme Court ruled that federal courts may enjoin state officials from violating federal law. The Court's ruling in Fitzpatrick v. Bitzer, 427 U.S. 445 (1976) allows Congress to abrogate state immunity from suit under Section 5 of the Fourteenth Amendment; this was broadened to include bankruptcy cases by Central Virginia Community College v. Katz, 546 U.S. 356 (2006), based on Article I, Section 8, Clause 4 of the Constitution. In Lapides v. Board of Regents of University System of Georgia, 535 U.S. 613 (2002), the Supreme Court ruled that when a state invokes a federal court's removal jurisdiction, it waives the Eleventh Amendment in the removed case.

=== Territorial application ===
The amendment's applicability to U.S. unincorporated territories, where under the Insular Cases constitutional rights do not fully apply, remained unclear for nearly two centuries after its ratification. In 1983, the Court of Appeals for the First Circuit ruled that Puerto Rico enjoys Eleventh Amendment immunity. However, subsequent rulings from other federal courts have determined that the other similarly unincorporated territories of American Samoa, Guam, the Northern Mariana Islands, and the Virgin Islands, do not enjoy Eleventh Amendment immunity.

=== Treaties and foreign relations ===
International law scholar Thomas H. Lee has argued that foreign states were intended to be excluded from the Eleventh Amendment's prohibition, so foreign governments would still be permitted to sue state governments. However, in Principality of Monaco v. Mississippi, 292 U.S. 313 (1934), the Supreme Court ruled that the amendment also protects states from lawsuits by foreign entities, which Lee considers a departure from established jurisprudence. He argues that the amendment exempted foreign governments in order to allow recourse for violations of treaty obligations, which in turn promoted positive and peaceful foreign relations between a fledgling U.S. and the international community. He also claims that the amendment reflected the international legal principle of sovereign equality, whereby foreign states were of equal legal status to U.S. states and as such could bring lawsuits.

== See also ==
- Atascadero State Hospital v. Scanlon
- Florida Prepaid Postsecondary Education Expense Board v. College Savings Bank
- Seminole Tribe of Florida v. Florida
