= Torres v. Texas Department of Public Safety =

- Supreme Court of the United States

Argued March 29, 2022 Decided June 29, 2022
- Full case name: Le Roy Torres v. Texas Department of Public Safety
- Docket no.: 20-603
- Citations: 597 U.S. 580 (more)
- Argument: Oral argument

Holding
- State sovereign immunity does not prevent states from being sued under federal law related to the nation's defense.

Court membership
- Chief Justice John Roberts Associate Justices Clarence Thomas · Stephen Breyer; Samuel Alito · Sonia Sotomayor; Elena Kagan · Neil Gorsuch; Brett Kavanaugh · Amy Coney Barrett

Case opinions
- Majority: Breyer, joined by Roberts, Sotomayor, Kagan, Kavanaugh
- Concurrence: Kagan
- Dissent: Thomas, joined by Alito, Gorsuch, Barrett

Laws applied
- Uniformed Services Employment and Re-employment Rights Act of 1994

Torres v. Texas Department of Public Safety, 597 U.S. 580 (2022), was a United States Supreme Court case dealing with the Uniformed Services Employment and Re-employment Rights Act of 1994 (USERRA) and state sovereign immunity. In a 5–4 decision issued in June 2022, the Court ruled that state sovereign immunity does not prevent states from being sued under federal law related to the nation's defense.

== Background ==
The Uniformed Services Employment and Re-employment Rights Act of 1994 was passed to assure that personnel in the U.S. military would be able to return to work at their former employer after deployment in the field. Should the person not be able to return to work in the same position, the employer must find a position "that provides similar status and pay". USERRA applies to all employers within the United States. The law was passed to prevent employers from discriminating based on military service.

Le Roy Torres, the petitioner in the case, had been working as a trooper in the Texas Highway Patrol, a division under the Texas Department of Public Safety, when he was called to deploy in Iraq in 2007 as part of his enlistment in the Army Reserve. When he returned, he had suffered lung damage from smoke inhalation at burn pits, and could not serve in the same position. He asked the Department for a similar position within the Highway Patrol but was denied any accommodation. Torres opted to resign and later sued the Department under USERRA. The Department argued that the state could not be sued under a federal law under the principle of state sovereign immunity. Both a Texas trial court and court of appeals agreed with the state's position, dismissing Torres' suit. The Supreme Court of Texas denied review.

== Supreme Court ==
The Supreme Court granted certiorari in December 2021, and heard oral arguments on March 29, 2022.

On June 29, 2022, the court reversed the Texas court of appeals in a 5–4 vote and remanded the case for further review. Justice Stephen Breyer wrote the majority opinion, which held that while states have sovereign immunity, it does not extend to areas of the nation's defense, and thus the state could be held liable for failing to follow USERRA, allowing Torres' lawsuit to proceed. Breyer wrote "Text, history and precedent show that the states, in coming together to form a union, agreed to sacrifice their sovereign immunity for the good of the common defense." Breyer quoted examples from 1872 onward that demonstrate that "Congress may legislate at the expense of traditional state sovereignty to raise and support the Armed Forces."

Justice Kagan wrote a concurrence that stated that in regards to state sovereign immunity, "our sovereign immunity decisions have not followed a straight line", though agreed that forgoing sovereign immunity was necessary for supporting the war powers of the nation.

Justice Clarence Thomas dissented. Thomas stated that "the 'history, practice, precedent and the structure of the Constitution' all demonstrate that states did not surrender their sovereign immunity in their own courts when Congress legislates pursuant to one of its war power". Thomas referred to the decision in Alden v. Maine which found that private citizens could not sue states under federal law, quoting Alden in that "the powers delegated to Congress under Article I of the United States Constitution do not include the power to subject nonconsenting States to private suits for damages in state courts".

The majority opinion in this case was the last opinion written by Justice Breyer before his retirement on June 30.
