= Abrogation doctrine =

Legal doctrine

The abrogation doctrine is a U.S. constitutional law doctrine expounding when and how the Congress may waive a state's sovereign immunity and subject it to lawsuits to which the state has not consented (i.e., to "abrogate" their immunity to such suits).

In Seminole Tribe v. Florida, the Supreme Court ruled that the Congress's authority, under Article One of the United States Constitution, could not be used to abrogate state sovereign immunity. However, the Congress can authorize lawsuits seeking monetary damages against individual U.S. states when it acts pursuant to powers delegated to it by amendments subsequent to the Eleventh Amendment. This is most frequently done pursuant to Section 5 of the Fourteenth Amendment, which explicitly allows the Congress to enforce its guarantees on the states and thus overrides states' Eleventh Amendment immunity.

The doctrine was first announced by the Supreme Court in a unanimous decision written by then-Associate Justice William Rehnquist, Fitzpatrick v. Bitzer. Bitzer "continued the line of reasoning that Rehnquist had acknowledged in Fry v. United States ... that cases involving Congress' authority under Section 5 present different problems than cases involving the Congress's Commerce Clause authority." The doctrine has since developed a number of nuances and limitations. In particular, later cases explained that the Court would not infer Congressional intent to abrogate sovereign immunity, but would only uphold abrogations where the Congress has "unequivocally express[ed] its intention to abrogate the Eleventh Amendment bar to suits against states in federal court." In order to do this, the Congress must "mak[e] its intention unmistakably clear in the language of the statute."

Another limitation that the courts have read into Congressional power to abrogate is the "congruence and proportionality" test, first discussed in City of Boerne v. Flores. Because the Fourteenth Amendment allows Congress to take "appropriate" action to enforce rights, the Court has determined that such action must be congruent and proportional to the deprivation of the right that the Congress is seeking to remedy. An example of a case where an act of Congress failed the Boerne test is Kimel v. Florida Board of Regents. An example where an act passed the Boerne test is Nevada Department of Human Resources v. Hibbs.
