= Fitzpatrick v. Bitzer =

- Supreme Court of the United States

Argued April 20–21, 1976 Decided June 28, 1976
- Full case name: Fitzpatrick, et al. v. Bitzer, Chairman, State Employees' Retirement Commission, et al. (75-251) consolidated with Bitzer, Chairman, State Employees' Retirement Commission, et al. v. Matthews, et al. (75-283)
- Citations: 427 U.S. 445 (more) 96 S. Ct. 2666; 49 L. Ed. 2d 614; 1976 U.S. LEXIS 160; 12 Fair Empl. Prac. Cas. (BNA) 1586; 12 Empl. Prac. Dec. (CCH) ¶ 10,999; 1 Employee Benefits Cas. (BNA) 1040

Case history
- Prior: Certiorari to the United States Court of Appeals for the Second Circuit

Holding
- The Fourteenth Amendment gives Congress the power to override a State's Eleventh Amendment sovereign immunity for the purpose of enforcing civil rights on the States.

Court membership
- Chief Justice Warren E. Burger Associate Justices William J. Brennan Jr. · Potter Stewart; Byron White · Thurgood Marshall; Harry Blackmun · Lewis F. Powell Jr. William Rehnquist · John P. Stevens

Case opinions
- Majority: Rehnquist, joined by Burger, Stewart, White, Marshall, Blackmun, Powell
- Concurrence: Brennan (in judgment)
- Concurrence: Stevens (in judgment)

Laws applied
- U.S. Const. amends. XI, XIV

Fitzpatrick v. Bitzer, 427 U.S. 445 (1976), was a United States Supreme Court decision that determined that the U.S. Congress has the power to abrogate the Eleventh Amendment sovereign immunity of the states, if this is done pursuant to its Fourteenth Amendment power to enforce upon the states the guarantees of the Fourteenth Amendment.

== Background ==
In 1972, Congress amended Title VII of the Civil Rights Act of 1964 to allow individuals to sue state governments for money damages for discrimination based on race, color, religion, sex, or national origin. The plaintiffs, a group of male retirees, sued the State of Connecticut for sex discrimination against them in its retirement policies. Connecticut invoked its Eleventh Amendment sovereign immunity, and both the District Court and the Court of Appeals allowed only injunctive relief; they denied monetary recovery, although the Court of Appeals permitted attorney's fees. Both of those courts pointed to Edelman v. Jordan, a US Supreme Court case holding that the Eleventh Amendment prohibits a federal court from ordering a state to pay money to an individual who is wronged by the state. The plaintiffs appealed to the Supreme Court.

== Issue ==
Can Congress abrogate state sovereign immunity under Section 5 of the Fourteenth Amendment?

== Decision ==
The Court, in an opinion by Justice William Rehnquist, distinguished previous cases in which attempts by individuals to sue the states for money damages (or the equivalent), including Edelman v. Jordan, had failed because the plaintiffs had not identified an express provision by Congress that permitted such lawsuits. The Court ruled that Congress has the power, under the Fourteenth Amendment, to abrogate sovereign immunity of states, as it was enacted specifically to limit the power of the states with the purpose of enforcing civil rights guarantees against them.

== See also ==
- List of United States Supreme Court cases, volume 427
