= Privileges and Immunities =

Privileges and Immunities may refer:

in international law, to privileges and immunities afforded by international treaties:

- Diplomatic immunity
- Consular immunity
- more specifically to specific international organizations and (partially) their staff, see in general Privileges and immunities or international organizations, and for particular organizations for example:
  - Convention on the Privileges and Immunities of the United Nations
  - Agreement on the Privileges and Immunities of the International Criminal Court
  - Privileges and immunities of the European Communities
  - Privileges and immunities of the Council of Europe

in national law, to privileges and immunities provided for in respective national laws:

- Sovereign immunity
- others, see Immunity#Law
- in U.S. law, see for example:
  - in the U.S. constitution, the Privileges and Immunities Clause (to be distinguished from the Privileges or Immunities Clause of the Fourteenth Amendment)
  - Sovereign immunity in the United States
  - privileges and immunities granted by the Foreign Sovereign Immunities Act
  - privileges and immunities granted by the International Organizations Immunities Act

== See also ==
- Immunity (disambiguation)
- Privilege (disambiguation)
