= Miami Showband killings =

1975 mass murder in Northern Ireland

- Part of the Troubles
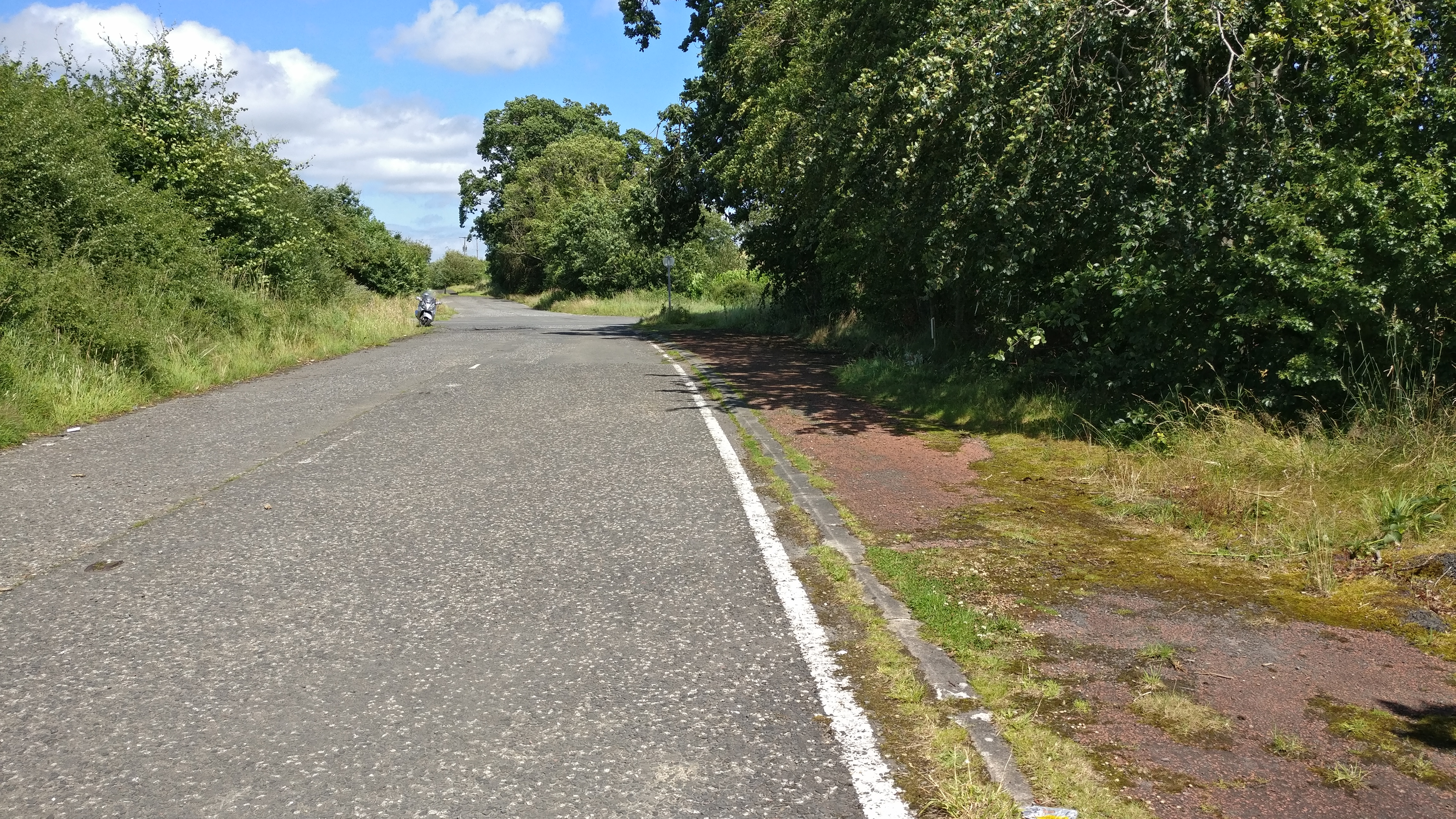
- Site of the massacre; a commemorative plaque shows where the band's minibus was parked in the lay-by

- Location: 54.2603°N 6.3159°W; A1 road at Buskhill, County Down, Northern Ireland
- Date: 31 July 1975; 51 years ago 2:30 am (BST)
- Attack type: Bombing, shooting
- Weapons: 2 L2A3 submachine guns, Luger pistol
- Deaths: 3 band members 2 Ulster Volunteer Force (UVF) members
- Injuries: 2 band members
- Perpetrator: UVF Mid-Ulster Brigade

Five people, including three members of The Miami Showband, were killed by the Ulster Volunteer Force (UVF), a loyalist paramilitary group, on 31 July 1975 on the A1 road at Buskhill in County Down, Northern Ireland.

The Miami Showband, one of Ireland's most popular cabaret bands, was travelling home to Dublin late at night after a performance in Banbridge. Halfway to Newry, their minibus was stopped at what appeared to be a military checkpoint where gunmen in British Army uniforms ordered them to line up by the roadside. At least four of the gunmen were soldiers from the Ulster Defence Regiment (UDR), and all were members of the UVF. Two of the gunmen, both soldiers, died when a time bomb they were hiding on the minibus exploded prematurely. The other gunmen then started shooting the dazed band members, killing three and wounding two. It has been suggested that the bomb was meant to explode en route, so that the victim band members would appear to be Irish Republican Army (IRA) bomb smugglers and stricter security measures would be established at the Irish border.

Two serving UDR soldiers and one former UDR soldier were found guilty of the murders and received life sentences; they were released in 1998. Those responsible for the attack belonged to the Glenanne gang, a secret alliance of loyalist militants, Royal Ulster Constabulary (RUC) police officers and UDR soldiers. There are also allegations that British military intelligence agents were involved. According to former Intelligence Corps agent Captain Fred Holroyd, the killings were organised by British intelligence officer Robert Nairac, together with the UVF Mid-Ulster Brigade and its commander, Robin "the Jackal" Jackson. The Historical Enquiries Team (HET) investigated the killings and released their report to the victims' families in December 2011, confirming that Jackson was linked to the attack by fingerprints.

The massacre dealt a blow to Northern Ireland's live music scene, which had brought young Catholics and Protestants together. In a report published in the Sunday Mirror in 1999, Colin Wills called the Miami Showband attack "one of the worst atrocities in the 30-year history of the Troubles." The Irish Times diarist Frank McNally summed up the massacre as "an incident that encapsulated all the madness of the time."

== Background ==
=== Political situation in Northern Ireland ===
The conflict in Northern Ireland, known as "the Troubles," began in the late 1960s. The year 1975 was marked by an escalation in sectarian attacks and a vicious feud between the two main loyalist paramilitary groups, the Ulster Volunteer Force (UVF) and the Ulster Defence Association (UDA). On 4 April 1974, the proscription against the UVF had been lifted by Merlyn Rees, Secretary of State for Northern Ireland. This meant that both it and the UDA were legal organisations. The UVF would be once more banned by the British government on 3 October 1975.

In May 1974, unionists called a general strike to protest against the Sunningdale Agreement – an attempt at power-sharing, setting up a Northern Ireland Executive and a cross-border Council of Ireland, which would have given the Government of Ireland a voice in the running of Northern Ireland. During that strike, on 17 May, the UVF carried out car bombings in Dublin and Monaghan, killing 33 civilians. The Provisional Irish Republican Army (IRA) carried out the bombing of two pubs in the English city of Birmingham the following November, resulting in 21 deaths.

In response to the bombings, Home Secretary Roy Jenkins introduced the Prevention of Terrorism Act, which gave the government unprecedented powers against the liberty of individuals in the United Kingdom in peacetime. At Christmas 1974 the IRA declared a ceasefire, which theoretically lasted throughout most of 1975. This move made loyalists apprehensive and suspicious that a secret accord was being conducted between the British government and the IRA, and that Northern Ireland's Protestants would be "sold out."

These fears were slightly grounded in fact, as MI6 officer Michael Oatley was involved in negotiations with a member of the IRA Army Council, during which "structures of disengagement" from Ireland were discussed, including the possible withdrawal of British troops from Northern Ireland. The existence of these talks led unionists to believe that they were about to be abandoned by the British government and forced into a united Ireland; as a result, loyalist paramilitary groups reacted with a violence that, combined with the tit-for-tat retaliations from the IRA (despite their ceasefire), made 1975 one of the "bloodiest years of the conflict."

In early 1975, Rees set up elections for the Northern Ireland Constitutional Convention at which all of Northern Ireland's politicians would plan their way forward. These were held on 1 May 1975 and the United Ulster Unionist Council (UUUC), which had won eleven out of twelve Northern Irish seats in the February 1974 general election, won a majority again. As the UUUC would not abide by any form of power-sharing with the Dublin government, no agreement could be reached and the convention failed, again marginalising Northern Ireland's politicians and the communities they represented.

=== Robin Jackson and the Mid-Ulster UVF ===
The UVF Mid-Ulster Brigade (Mid-Ulster UVF) operated mainly around the Portadown and Lurgan areas. It had been set up in Lurgan in 1972 by part-time Ulster Defence Regiment (UDR) sergeant and permanent staff instructor Billy Hanna, who appointed himself commander of the brigade. His leadership was endorsed by UVF leader Gusty Spence. The brigade was described by author Don Mullan as one of the most ruthless units operating in the 1970s.

At the time of the Miami Showband killings, the Mid-Ulster UVF was commanded by Robin Jackson, also known as "The Jackal." Jackson had assumed command just a few days before the attack, after allegedly shooting Hanna dead outside his home in Lurgan on 27 July 1975. According to authors Martin Dillon and Paul Larkin, Jackson was accompanied by Harris Boyle during the killing. Hanna was named by former British Intelligence Corps operative Colin Wallace as having organised and led the Dublin bombings, along with Jackson. Journalist Joe Tiernan suggested that Hanna was shot for refusing to participate in the Miami Showband attack and that he had become an informer for the Garda Síochána in exchange for immunity from prosecution for the bombings. Dillon suggested that because there were a number of UDR members in the UVF, and were planned to be used for the Miami Showband attack, Hanna was considered to have been a "security risk" and subsequently killed.

Jackson was an alleged RUC Special Branch agent who was later suggested by the Yorkshire Television documentary The Hidden Hand to have had links to both the Intelligence Corps and Captain Robert Nairac of the Grenadier Guards. A report in the Irish Times implicated Jackson in the Dublin bombings. More than 100 killings have been attributed to Jackson by the Pat Finucane Centre, the Derry-based civil rights group.

=== The Miami Showband ===
The Miami Showband in 1975; one of the last photos of the band before the attack. L–R: Tony Geraghty, Fran O'Toole, Ray Millar, Des McAlea ("Des Lee"), Brian McCoy, Stephen Travers

The Miami Showband was a popular Dublin-based Irish showband, enjoying fame and, according to journalist Peter Taylor, "Beatle-like devotion" from fans on both sides of the Irish border. A typical Irish showband was based on the popular six- or seven-member dance band. Its basic repertoire included cover versions of pop songs that were currently in the charts and standard dance numbers. The music ranged from rock and country and western to Dixieland jazz. Sometimes the showbands played traditional Irish music at their performances.

Originally called the Downbeats Quartet, the Miami Showband was reformed in 1962 by rock promoter Tom Doherty, who gave them their new name. With Dublin-born singer Jimmy Harte followed by Dickie Rock as lead vocalists, the band underwent many personnel changes over the years. In December 1972, Rock left the band to be briefly replaced by two brothers, Frankie and Johnny Simon. That same year, keyboardist Francis "Fran" O'Toole had won the Gold Star Award on RTÉ's Reach For the Stars television programme. In early 1973, Billy MacDonald (a.k.a. "Billy Mac") took over as lead vocalist when the Simon brothers quit the band. The following year, O'Toole became lead vocalist after Mick Roche (Billy Mac's replacement) was sacked. O'Toole was noted for his good looks and popularity with female fans, and was described by the band's former bass guitarist, Paul Ashford, as having been the "greatest soul singer" in Ireland. Ashford had been asked to leave the band in 1973 after complaining that performing in Northern Ireland put their lives at risk. He was replaced by Johnny Brown, who in turn was replaced by Dave Monks until Stephen Travers eventually became the band's permanent bassist. In late 1974, the Miami Showband's song "Clap Your Hands and Stomp Your Feet" (featuring O'Toole on lead vocals) reached no. 8 in the Irish charts.

The 1975 line-up comprised four Catholics and two Protestants. They were: lead vocalist and keyboard player Fran O'Toole (28), Catholic, from Bray, County Wicklow; guitarist Anthony "Tony" Geraghty (24), Catholic, from Dublin; trumpeter Brian McCoy (32), Protestant, from Caledon, County Tyrone; saxophonist Des "Des Lee" McAlea (24), Catholic, from Belfast; bassist Stephen Travers (24), Catholic, from Carrick-on-Suir, County Tipperary; and drummer Ray Millar, Protestant, from Antrim. O'Toole and McCoy were both married; each had two children. Geraghty was engaged to be married.

The Miami Showband's music was described as "contemporary and trans-Atlantic", with no reference to the Northern Ireland conflict. By 1975 they had gained a large following, playing to crowds of people in dance halls and ballrooms across the island. The band had no overt interest in politics nor in the religious beliefs of the people who made up their audience. They were prepared to travel anywhere in Ireland to perform for their fans.

According to the Irish Times, at the height of Irish showbands' popularity (from the 1950s to the 1970s), as many as 700 bands travelled to venues all over Ireland on a nightly basis.

== Ambush ==
=== Bogus checkpoint ===
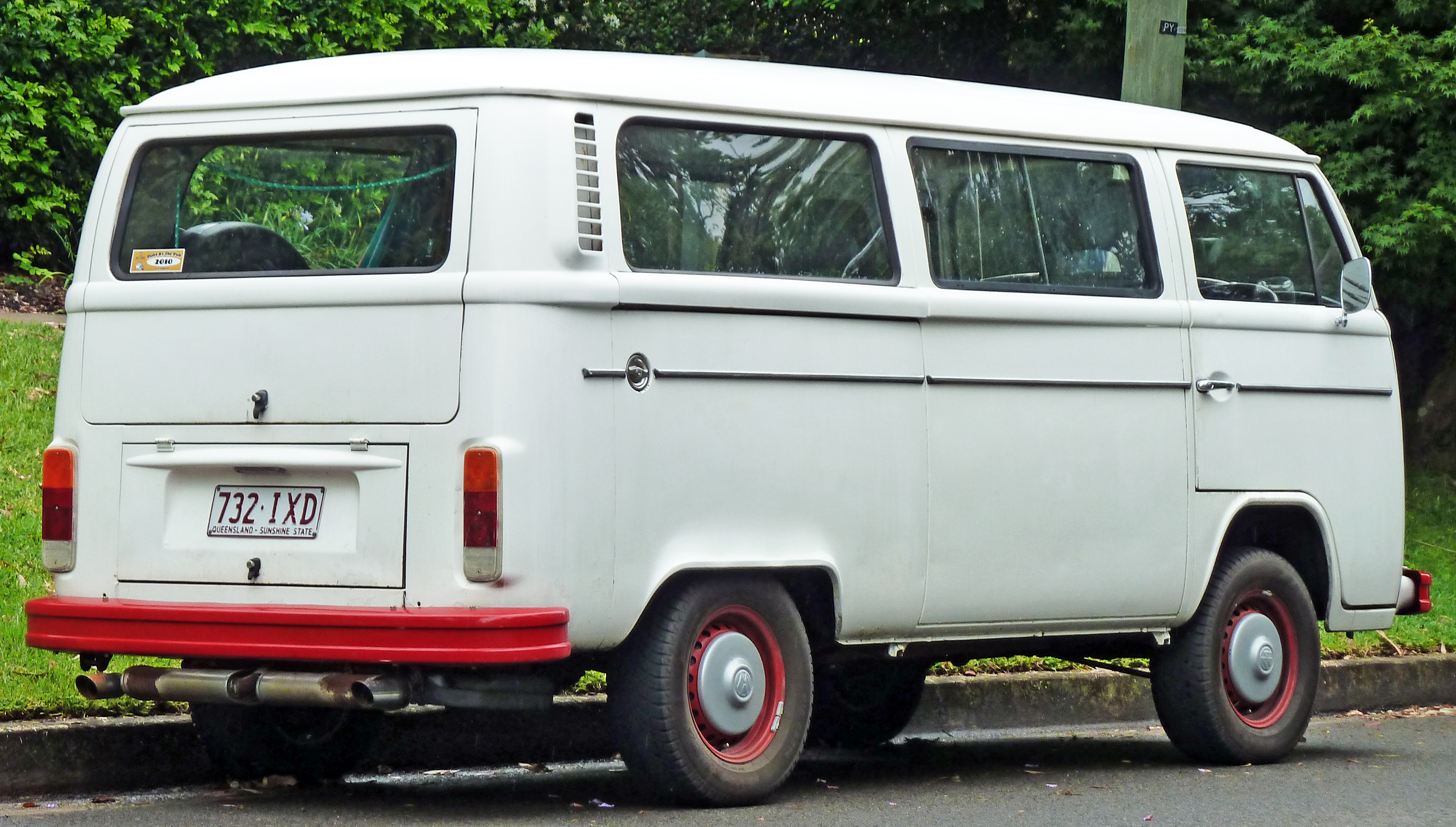
Volkswagen Type 2 (T2) similar to the minibus used by the band

In the early morning hours of Thursday 31 July 1975, five members of the Miami Showband were travelling home to Dublin after a performance at the Castle Ballroom in Banbridge, County Down. Millar was not with them, as he had chosen to go to his hometown of Antrim to spend the night with his parents. The band's road manager, Brian Maguire, had already gone ahead a few minutes earlier in an equipment van.

At about 2:30 am, when the band was seven miles (11 km) north of Newry on the main A1 road, their Volkswagen Type 2 minibus (driven by McCoy with Travers in the front seat beside him) reached the townland of Buskhill. Near the junction with Buskhill Road they were flagged down by armed men dressed in British Army uniforms waving a red torch in a circular motion. During "The Troubles" it was normal for the British Army to set up checkpoints at any time.

Assuming it was a legitimate checkpoint, McCoy informed the others inside the minibus and pulled in at the lay-by as directed by the armed men. As McCoy rolled down the window and produced his driving licence, gunmen came up to the minibus and one of them said in a Northern Irish accent, "Goodnight, fellas. How are things? Can you step out of the van for a few minutes and we'll just do a check." The unsuspecting musicians got out and were politely told to line up facing the ditch at the rear of the minibus with their hands on their heads. More uniformed men appeared from out of the darkness, their guns pointed at the minibus. About ten gunmen were at the checkpoint, according to author Martin Dillon.

After McCoy told them they were the Miami Showband, Thomas Crozier (who was holding a notebook) asked the band members for their names and addresses, while the others bantered with them about the success of their performance at Banbridge and playfully asked which one was Rock. As Crozier took down the information, a car pulled up and another uniformed man appeared on the scene. This individual wore a uniform and beret noticeably different from the others. He spoke with an educated English accent and immediately took charge, ordering a man who appeared to have been the leader of the patrol to tell Crozier to obtain their names and dates of birth instead of addresses.

The jocular mood of the gunmen abruptly ceased. At no time did this new soldier speak to any of the band members nor did he directly address Crozier, relaying all his instructions to the gunman in command. Travers assumed he was a British Army officer, an opinion shared by McCoy. Just after the arrival of this mysterious soldier, McCoy nudged Travers, who was standing beside him, and reassured him by saying, "Don't worry Stephen, this is British Army." Travers thought that McCoy, a Protestant from Northern Ireland, was familiar with security checkpoints and had reckoned the regular army would be more efficient than the UDR, who had a reputation for unprofessional and unpredictable behaviour, especially toward people from the Republic.

McCoy, son of the Orange Order's Grand Master for County Tyrone, had close relatives in the security forces; his brother-in-law was a former member of the B Specials, which had been disbanded in 1970. Travers described McCoy as a "sophisticated, father-type figure. Everybody was respectful to Brian." McCoy's words, therefore, were taken seriously by the other band members, and anything he said was considered to be accurate.

=== Explosion ===
At least four of the gunmen were soldiers from the UDR. Dillon suggests in The Dirty War that at least five serving UDR soldiers were present at the checkpoint. All of the gunmen were members of the Mid-Ulster UVF and had been lying in wait to ambush the band, having set up the checkpoint just minutes before. Out of sight of the band members, two of the gunmen placed a ten-pound (4.5 kg) time bomb that was inside a briefcase under the driver's seat of the minibus.

The UVF's plan was that the bomb would explode once the minibus had reached Newry, killing all on board. However, Dillon alleges that the bomb was meant to go off in the Irish Republic, suggesting that had all gone according to plan, the loyalists would have been able to clandestinely bomb the Republic, yet claim that the band were republican bomb-smugglers carrying explosives on behalf of the IRA. They had hoped to embarrass the Irish government, as well as to draw attention to its level of control of the border. This might have resulted in Irish authorities enforcing tighter controls over the border, thus restricting IRA operations. Dillon opined that another reason the UVF decided to target the band was because Irish nationalists held them in high regard; to attack the band was to strike the nationalists indirectly.

McAlea and Travers heard two of the gunmen rummaging in the back of the minibus, where they both kept their respective instruments. Concerned they might be damaged, McAlea first approached them and asked if he could remove his saxophone. When they agreed he placed it on the ground, opened its case and then went back into line; however, this time he stood first in the line-up closest to the minibus when previously he had been third. Travers also approached the gunmen and told them to be careful with his guitar. Asked whether he had anything valuable inside the case, Travers replied in the negative. The gunman turned him round, punched him hard in the back and pushed him on the shoulder back into the line-up. Meanwhile, two other gunmen at the front of the minibus were placing the briefcase containing the bomb under the driver's seat.

When the device was tilted on its side, clumsy soldering on the clock used as a timer caused the bomb to explode prematurely, blowing the minibus apart and killing UVF men Harris Boyle (aged 22, a telephone wireman from Portadown) and Wesley Somerville (aged 34, a textile worker from Moygashel) instantly. Hurled in opposite directions, they were both decapitated and their bodies blown apart. What little that remained intact of their bodies was burnt beyond recognition; one of the limbless torsos was completely charred.

=== Shootings ===
Following the explosion, pandemonium broke out among the remaining gunmen; shouting obscenities, they started shooting the dazed band members, who had all been blown down into the field below the level of the road from the force of the blast. According to Dillon, the order to shoot was given by the patrol's apparent leader, James McDowell, to eliminate witnesses to the bogus checkpoint and subsequent bombing. Three of the musicians were killed: lead singer O'Toole, trumpeter McCoy and guitarist Geraghty.

McCoy was the first to die, having been hit in the back and neck by four rounds from a 9mm Luger pistol in the initial volley of gunfire. Despite the heavy gunfire, Geraghty and O'Toole attempted to carry a severely injured bassist Travers to safety, but were unable to move him far. O'Toole attempted to run away, but was quickly chased down by the gunmen who had immediately jumped down into the field in pursuit. He was then machine-gunned 22 times, mostly in the face, as he lay supine on the ground. Almost his entire head was destroyed. Geraghty also attempted to escape; but he was caught by the gunmen and shot twice in the back of his head and a number of times in the back. Both men had pleaded for their lives before they were shot; one had cried out, "Please don't shoot me — don't kill me."

Travers was seriously wounded by a dum-dum bullet which had struck him when the gunmen had first begun shooting. He survived by pretending to be dead as he lay beside the body of McCoy. Saxophonist McAlea, who had been standing closest to the minibus, was struck by its door when it was blown off in the explosion, but was not badly wounded. He lay hidden in thick undergrowth, face down, undetected by the gunmen. He also survived by remaining silent, pretending he was dead. However, the flames from a burning hedge (which had been set on fire by the explosion) soon came dangerously close to where he lay; he was forced to leave his hiding spot. By this time the gunmen had left the scene, assuming everyone else had been killed. Travers later recalled hearing one of the departing gunmen tell his comrade who had kicked McCoy's body to make sure he was not alive: "Come on, those bastards are dead. I got them with dum-dums." McAlea made his way up the embankment to the main road where he hitched a lift to alert the RUC at their barracks in Newry.

=== Forensic and ballistic evidence ===
When the RUC arrived at the site they found five dead bodies, charred body parts, a seriously injured Travers, the smouldering remains of the minibus, debris from the bomb blast, bullets, spent cartridges and the band members' personal possessions, including clothing, shoes and a photograph of the group, strewn across the area. They also discovered a stolen white Ford Escort, registration number 4933 LZ, which had been left behind by the gunmen, along with two guns, ammunition, green UDR berets and a pair of glasses later traced to McDowell.

One of the first RUC men who arrived at Buskhill in the wake of the killings was scenes of crime officer James O'Neill. He described the scene as having "just the smell of utterly death about the place ... burning blood, burning tyres." He also added that "that bomb was definitely placed there with a view to killing all in that band."

The only identifiable body part from the bombers to survive the blast (which had been heard up to 4 miles (6.4 km) away) was a severed arm belonging to Somerville. It was found 100 yards (91 m) from the site with a "UVF Portadown" tattoo on it. The RUC's investigative unit, the Assassination or "A" Squad, was set up to investigate the crime and to discover the identities of the UVF gunmen who perpetrated the killings. Afterward, as Travers recovered in hospital, McAlea gave police a description of McDowell as the gunman with a moustache and wearing dark glasses who appeared to have been the leader of the patrol. Sometime after the attack, RUC officers questioned Travers at Dublin Castle. He subsequently stated they refused to accept his description of the different-coloured beret worn by the soldier with the English accent. The UVF gunmen had worn green UDR berets, whereas the soldier's had been lighter in colour.

The dead bombers were named by the UVF, in a statement issued within twelve hours of the attack. Boyle and Somerville were UDR soldiers as well as holding the rank of major and lieutenant, respectively, in the UVF. In 1993, Boyle was named by The Hidden Hand programme as one of the Dublin car bombers.

The stolen Ford Escort belonged to a man from Portadown, who according to Captain Fred Holroyd, had links with one of the UVF bombers and David Alexander Mulholland, the driver of the bomb car which had been left to explode in Parnell Street during the Dublin and Monaghan bombings. He was also one of the prime suspects in the sectarian killing of Dorothy Traynor on 1 April 1975 in Portadown.

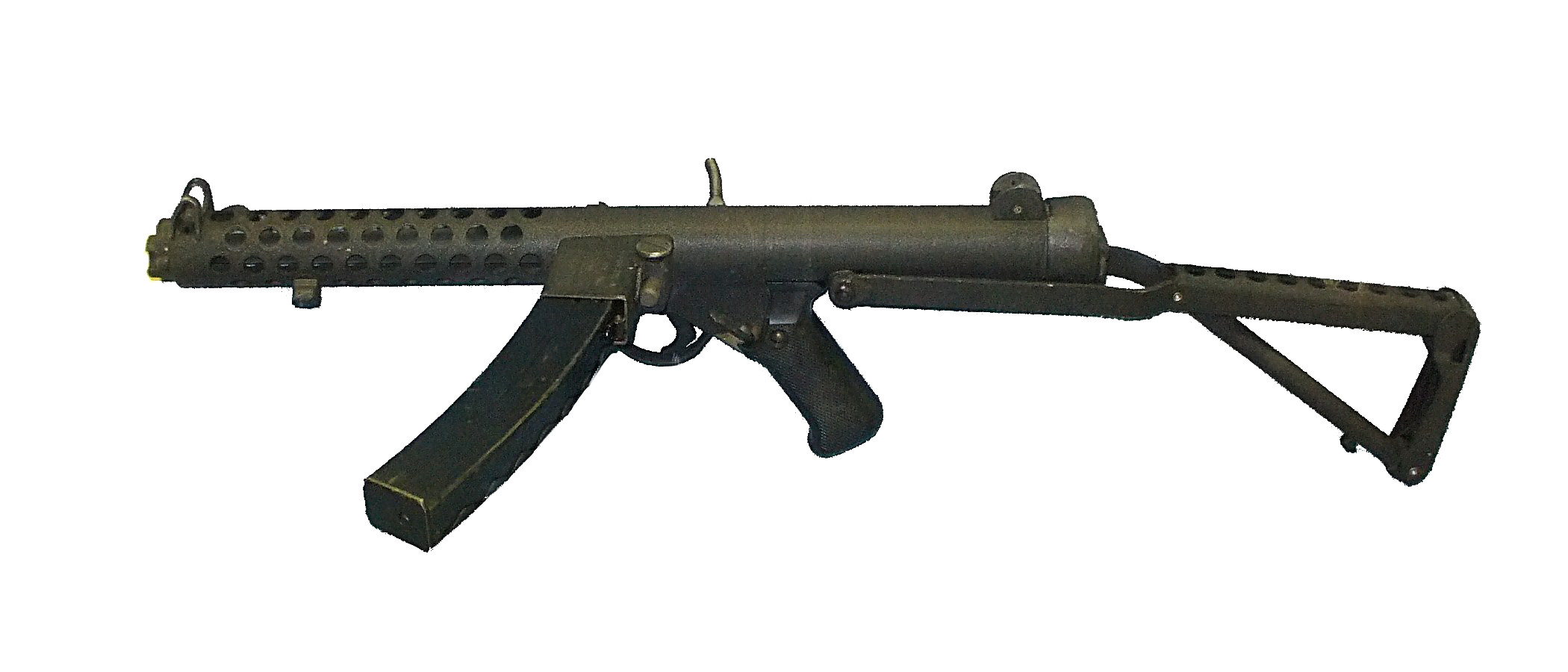
Sterling submachine gun similar to those used in the attack

Ballistic evidence indicates that the ten-member gang took at least six guns with them on the attack. An independent panel of inquiry commissioned by the Pat Finucane Centre later established that among the weapons used in the killings were two Sterling submachine guns and a 9 mm Luger pistol, serial no. U 4. The submachine guns, which had been stolen years earlier from a former member of the B Specials, were linked to prior and later sectarian killings, whereas the Luger had been used to kill leading IRA member John Francis Green the previous January.

In a letter to the Independent Commission of Inquiry into the Bombing of Kay's Tavern dated 22 February 2004, the Northern Ireland Office stated that: "The PSNI have confirmed that a 9 mm Luger pistol was ballistically traced both to the murder of John Francis Green and to the Miami Showband murders." In May 1976, Jackson's fingerprints were discovered on the metal barrel of a homemade silencer constructed for a Luger. Both the pistol and silencer – which was later established to have been the same one used in the Miami Showband killings – were found by the security forces at the home of Edward Sinclair. Jackson was charged with possession of the silencer but not convicted; the trial judge said: "I find that the accused somehow touched the silencer, but the Crown evidence has left me completely in the dark as to whether he did that wittingly or unwittingly, willingly or unwillingly." The Luger was destroyed by the RUC on 28 August 1978.

== Aftermath ==
=== Reactions ===
Within twelve hours of the attack, the UVF's Brigade Staff (Belfast leadership based on the Shankill Road) issued a statement. Released under the heading Ulster Central Intelligence Agency – Miami Showband Incident Report, it read:

A UVF patrol led by Major Boyle was suspicious of two vehicles, a minibus and a car parked near the border. Major Boyle ordered his patrol to apprehend the occupants for questioning. As they were being questioned, Major Boyle and Lieutenant Somerville began to search the minibus. As they began to enter the vehicle, a bomb was detonated and both men were killed outright. At the precise moment of the explosion, the patrol came under intense automatic fire from the occupants of the other vehicle. The patrol sergeant immediately ordered the patrol to shoot back. Using self-loading rifles and sub-machine guns, the patrol shot back, killing three of their attackers and wounding another. The patrol later recovered two Armalite rifles and a pistol. The UVF maintains regular border patrols due to the continued activity of the Provisional IRA. The Mid-Ulster Battalion has been assisting the South Down-South Armagh units since the IRA Forkhill boobytrap which killed four British soldiers. Three UVF members are being treated for gunshot wounds after last night but not in hospital.

The statement also read:

It would appear that the UVF patrol surprised members of a terrorist organisation transferring weapons to the Miami Showband minibus and that an explosive device of some description was being carried by the Showband for an unlawful purpose. It is obvious, therefore, that the UVF patrol was justified in taking the action it did and that the killing of the three Showband members should be regarded as justifiable homicide. The Officers and Agents of the Ulster Central Intelligence Agency commend the UVF on their actions and tender their deepest sympathy to the relatives of the two Officers who died while attempting to remove the bomb from the minibus.

Boyle and Somerville were given UVF paramilitary funerals conducted by Free Presbyterian minister William McCrea, a Democratic Unionist Party politician.

The killings shocked the whole of Ireland and put a serious strain on Anglo-Irish relations. The Irish Times reported that on the night following the attack, British ambassador Sir Arthur Galsworthy was summoned to hear the Irish government's strong feelings regarding the murder of the three band members. The Irish government held the view that the British Government had not done enough to stop sectarian assassinations in Northern Ireland.

Following the post-mortems, funerals were held for the three slain musicians; they received televised news coverage by RTÉ, Ireland's public service broadcaster. According to RTÉ, "Their families were in deep mourning and Ireland mourned with them".

According to journalist Peter Taylor, the IRA's gun and bomb attack on the loyalist Bayardo Bar in Shankill Road on 13 August was in retaliation for the Miami Showband killings. Four Protestant civilians (two men and two women) and UVF member Hugh Harris were killed in the attack. Two days later, Portadown disc jockey Norman "Mooch" Kerr, aged 28, was shot dead by the IRA as he packed up his equipment after a show at the Camrick Bar in Armagh. Although not a member of any loyalist paramilitary group, he was a close friend of Boyle and the two were often seen together. The IRA said it killed him because of an alleged association with Nairac and claimed it was in possession of Kerr's diary, which had been stolen in Portadown.

=== Gilford and Altnamachin attacks ===
Over the following month, there were two similar attacks in the area.

The night after the massacre, gunmen shot a minibus near Gilford. It had been travelling from Banbridge to Bleary with nine people on board; all were Catholics and most had been returning from a regular bingo session. One report says it was stopped at a fake British Army checkpoint. Two Catholic civilians were killed: passenger Joseph Toland, who was killed outright, and driver James Marks, who died of his wounds in January 1976. Three others were wounded. The attack was blamed on loyalists; Lost Lives – an account of every death in the conflict – states that reliable loyalist sources confirmed the UVF was responsible. However, police at the time blamed the IRA. The RUC suggested the IRA had meant to attack a police minibus in revenge for the Miami killings but had mistakenly attacked a civilian minibus instead. A report by Police Service of Northern Ireland's Historical Enquiries Team (HET) also suggests this. The IRA has denied responsibility.

On 24 August 1975, Catholic civilians Colm McCartney and Sean Farmer, driving home from a Gaelic football match in Dublin, were stopped in their car at what is believed to have been another fake checkpoint at Altnamackin (near Newtownhamilton). The two men were found shot dead nearby. Earlier that night, three RUC officers in an unmarked car had been stopped at a checkpoint but allowed through. However, the officers suspected that the checkpoint was fake. After receiving radio confirmation that there were no authorised checkpoints in the area that night, they reported the incident and requested help from the British Army to investigate, but no action was taken.

RUC officer John Weir claims that UDR corporal and alleged UVF member Robert McConnell was involved in the murders of McCartney and Farmer. Anne Cadwallader also affirmed McConnell's culpability in Lethal Allies: British Collusion in Ireland.

=== Convictions ===
A number of suspects were arrested by the RUC in early August 1975. One of these men, Lance-Corporal Thomas Raymond Crozier (aged 25, a painting contractor from Lurgan) of C Company, 11th Battalion UDR, was charged with the Miami Showband killings. Crozier recounted that on the night of the killings, he had driven to the grounds of a school in Lurgan where he had picked up two men. He then drove to the A1 lay-by and met up with another five men, who were all wearing British Army uniforms. They subsequently set up a roadblock with "all the trappings of a regular military checkpoint." Crozier told police, and later a court, that he had not played a large part in the attack. He refused to name his accomplices, stating that doing so would put the lives of his family in danger.

On 22 January 1976, a second UDR soldier, Sergeant James Roderick Shane McDowell (aged 29, an optical worker, also from Lurgan) was arrested and charged with the Miami Showband killings. He also served in C Company, 11th Battalion UDR. The RUC were led to him through analysis of his glasses, which had been found at the murder scene. Tests revealed that the lenses of the glasses were of a prescription worn by just 1 in 500,000 of the population. McDowell had previously been arrested at Jackson's Lurgan home, by police searching for the killers of an elderly Catholic couple Peter and Jenny McKearney on 23 October 1975, but had been immediately released.

McDowell's statement of admission was published in David McKittrick's book Lost Lives:

There was very little planning. I only came into it because of my UDR connection and the fact that I had a uniform. I was given a sub-machine gun but I had never fired it. I passed out when the explosion happened and that was when I lost the gun, the glasses, and a UDR beret.

On 15 October 1976, Crozier and McDowell both received life sentences for the Miami Showband killings. McDowell had pleaded guilty. Crozier had pleaded not guilty. The judge, by sentencing McDowell and Crozier to 35 years' imprisonment each, had handed down the longest life sentences in the history of Northern Ireland; he commented that "killings like the Miami Showband must be stopped." He added that had the death penalty not been abolished, it would have been imposed in this case. During the trial, McAlea had received death threats which made him fear for the safety of his family; this caused him to eventually leave Northern Ireland.

A third individual, former UDR soldier John James Somerville (aged 37, a lorry helper and the brother of Wesley), was arrested following an RUC raid in Dungannon on 26 September 1980. He was charged with the Miami Showband killings, the attempted murder of Stephen Travers and the murder of Patrick Falls in 1974. He was given a total of four life sentences (three for the murders of the Miami Showband members and one for the Falls murder) on 9 November 1981; he had pleaded not guilty. The three convicted UVF men, although admitting to having been at the scene, denied having shot anyone. None of the men ever named their accomplices, and the other UVF gunmen were never caught. The three men were sent to serve their sentence in the Maze Prison, on the outskirts of Lisburn. Fortnight Magazine reported that on 1 June 1982, John James Somerville began a hunger strike at the Maze to obtain special category status. Crozier, McDowell and John James Somerville were released after 1998 under the terms of the Belfast Agreement.

=== Allegations ===
A continued allegation in the case has been the presence of Nairac at the scene. Holroyd, and others, suggested that Nairac had organised the attack in co-operation with Jackson and the Mid-Ulster UVF. In his first parliamentary speech on 7 July 1987, Ken Livingstone MP told the House of Commons that "it was likely" Nairac had organised the attack. Travers and McAlea told police and later testified in court that a "man in a different uniform and beret" with a "crisp, clipped English accent" oversaw the attack, the implication being that this was Nairac. In his book The Dirty War, Dillon adamantly dismissed the allegation that Nairac had been present, believing it was based on the erroneous linkage of Nairac to the earlier murder of Green – the same pistol was used in both attacks. Regarding the soldier with the English accent, Dillon wrote:

[I]t is to say the least highly dubious, if not absurd to conclude from such superficial factors that Nairac was present at the Miami murders. I was told by a source close to "Mr. A" and another loyalist hitman that Nairac was not present at either murder [Miami Showband and John Francis Green].

Travers had described the English-accented man as having been of normal height and thought he had fair hair (whereas Nairac was dark-haired), but was not certain. He was not able to positively identify Nairac, from his photograph, as having been the man. The RTÉ programme Today Tonight aired a documentary in 1987 in which it claimed that former UVF associates of Boyle revealed to the programme's researchers that Nairac had deliberately detonated the bomb to eliminate Boyle, with whom he had carried out the Green killing. Journalist Emily O'Reilly noted in the Sunday Tribune that none of the three men convicted of the massacre ever implicated Nairac in the attack or accused him of causing Boyle's death.

Retired diplomat Alistair Kerr wrote a biography of Nairac entitled Betrayal: the Murder of Robert Nairac published in 2015, which offers documentary evidence that clears Nairac of having personally overseen the attack. According to Kerr, at the time of the ambush, Nairac had started out on a road journey from London to Scotland for a fishing holiday. He also provides other alibis for Nairac precluding his presence at the scenes of both the Green killing and the Dublin and Monaghan bombings. However, Ministry of Defence documents released in 2020 contain suggestions that Nairac acquired equipment and uniforms for the Miami Showband killers, and that he was responsible for the planning and execution of the attack itself.

Brian Maguire, the Miami Showband's road manager, stated that when he drove away from Banbridge in the lead, a few minutes ahead of the band's minibus, he passed through security barriers manned by the RUC. As he continued ahead, up the by-pass toward Newry, he noticed a blue Triumph 2000 pulling out from where it had been parked in a lay-by. Maguire recalled that the car first slowed down, then accelerated, flashing its lights. Two men had been observed acting suspiciously inside the Castle Ballroom during the Miami Showband's performance that night, suggesting that the band's movements were being carefully monitored.

Another persistent allegation is the direct involvement of Jackson, a native of Donaghmore, County Down, 1.5 miles (2.4 km) away from Buskhill. He was one of the men taken in by the RUC in August 1975 and questioned as a suspect in the killings but released without charge. The independent panel of inquiry commissioned by the Pat Finucane Centre concluded that there was "credible evidence that the principal perpetrator [of the Miami Showband attack] was a man who was not prosecuted – alleged RUC Special Branch agent Robin Jackson." The same panel revealed that about six weeks before the attack, Crozier, Jackson and the latter's brother-in-law Samuel Fulton Neill were arrested for the possession of four shotguns. Neill's Triumph car was one of those allegedly used in the attack. Neill was later shot dead in Portadown on 25 January 1976, allegedly by Jackson for having informed the RUC about Crozier's participation in the attack. The panel stated that it was unclear why Crozier, Jackson and Neill were not in police custody at the time the killings took place.

Dillon maintains in The Dirty War that the Miami Showband attack was planned weeks before at a house in Portadown, and the person in charge of the overall operation was a former UDR man, whom Dillon referred to for legal reasons as "Mr. A." Dillon also opines in God and the Gun: The Church and Irish Terrorism that the dead bombers, Harris Boyle and Wesley Somerville, had actually led the UVF gang at Buskhill. Journalists Kevin Dowling and Liam Collins in the Irish Independent, however, suggested in their respective articles that Jackson had been the leader of the unit.

The Pat Finucane Centre has named the Miami Showband killings as one of the 87 violent attacks perpetrated by the Glenanne gang against the Irish nationalist community in the 1970s. The Glenanne gang was a loose alliance of Ulster loyalists which consisted of a combination of UDR soldiers, RUC police officers and UVF paramilitaries, carrying out sectarian killings in the Mid-Ulster area. Their name comes from a farm in Glenanne, County Armagh, which was owned by RUC reservist James Mitchell; according to Weir, the farm was used as a UVF arms dump and bomb-making site. Weir alleged the bomb used in the Miami Showband attack came from Mitchell's farm. His affidavit implicating Jackson in a number of attacks, including the Dublin and Monaghan bombings, was published in the 2003 Barron Report; the findings of an official investigation into the bombings commissioned by Irish Supreme Court Judge Henry Barron.

== Later years ==
During the six years from the onset of the Troubles until the July 1975 attack, there had never been an incident involving any of the showbands. The incident had an adverse effect on the Irish showband scene, with many of the bands afraid to play in Northern Ireland. The emergence of discos later in the decade meant that ballrooms were converted into nightclubs, leaving the showbands with few venues available in which to perform. By the mid-1980s, the showbands had lost their appeal to the Irish public; although The Miami Showband, albeit with a series of different line-ups, did not disband until 1986. The Miami Showband reformed in 2008, with Travers, McAlea and Ray Millar, plus new members. It is fronted by McAlea, who returned to Northern Ireland the same year after living in South Africa since about 1982.

In 1994, Eric Smyth, a former UDR member and brother-in-law to Brian McCoy, Sheila, was killed by the IRA.

Travers travelled to Belfast in 2006 for a secret meeting with the second-in-command of the UVF's Brigade Staff in an attempt to come to terms with the killing of his former colleagues and friends. The meeting was arranged by Rev. Chris Hudson, a former intermediary between the Irish government and the UVF, whose role was crucial to the Northern Ireland peace process. Hudson, a Unitarian minister, had been a close friend of O'Toole. The encounter took place inside Hudson's church, All Souls Belfast. The UVF man, who identified himself only as "the Craftsman," apologised to Travers for the attack, and explained that the UVF gunmen shot the band because they "had panicked" that night. It was revealed in Peter Taylor's book Loyalists that "the Craftsman" had been instrumental in bringing about the 1994 ceasefire by the Combined Loyalist Military Command (CLMC).

Travers also visited the home of Thomas Crozier, hoping to meet with him, but Crozier did not come to the door. James McDowell lives in Lurgan, and John James Somerville became an evangelical minister in Belfast. The UVF had cut all ties with Somerville after he had opposed the 1994 ceasefire. In January 2015, Somerville was found dead in his Shankill Road flat of kidney cancer, aged 70.

== Memorials ==
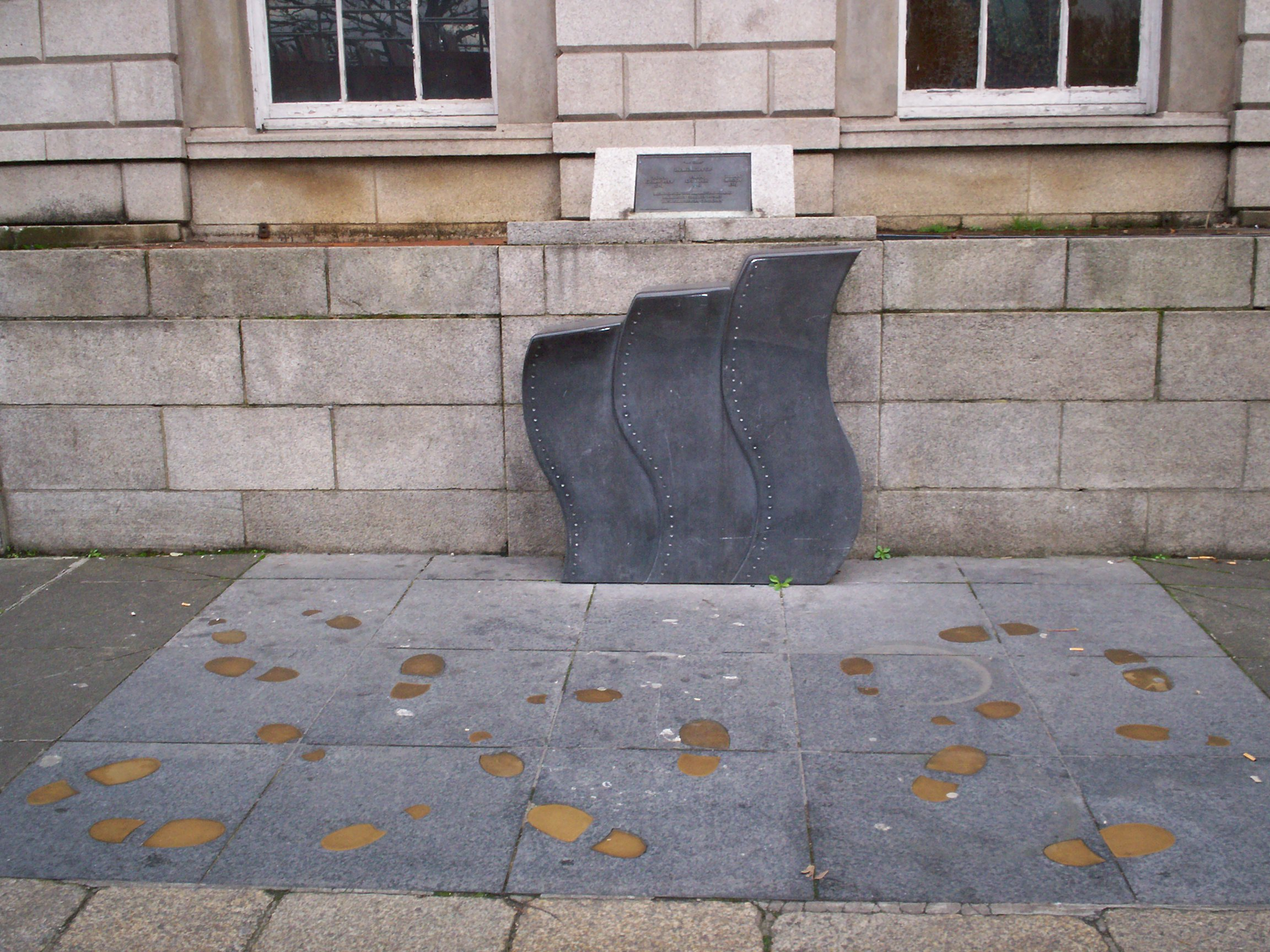
"Let's Dance" memorial in Parnell Square North, Dublin

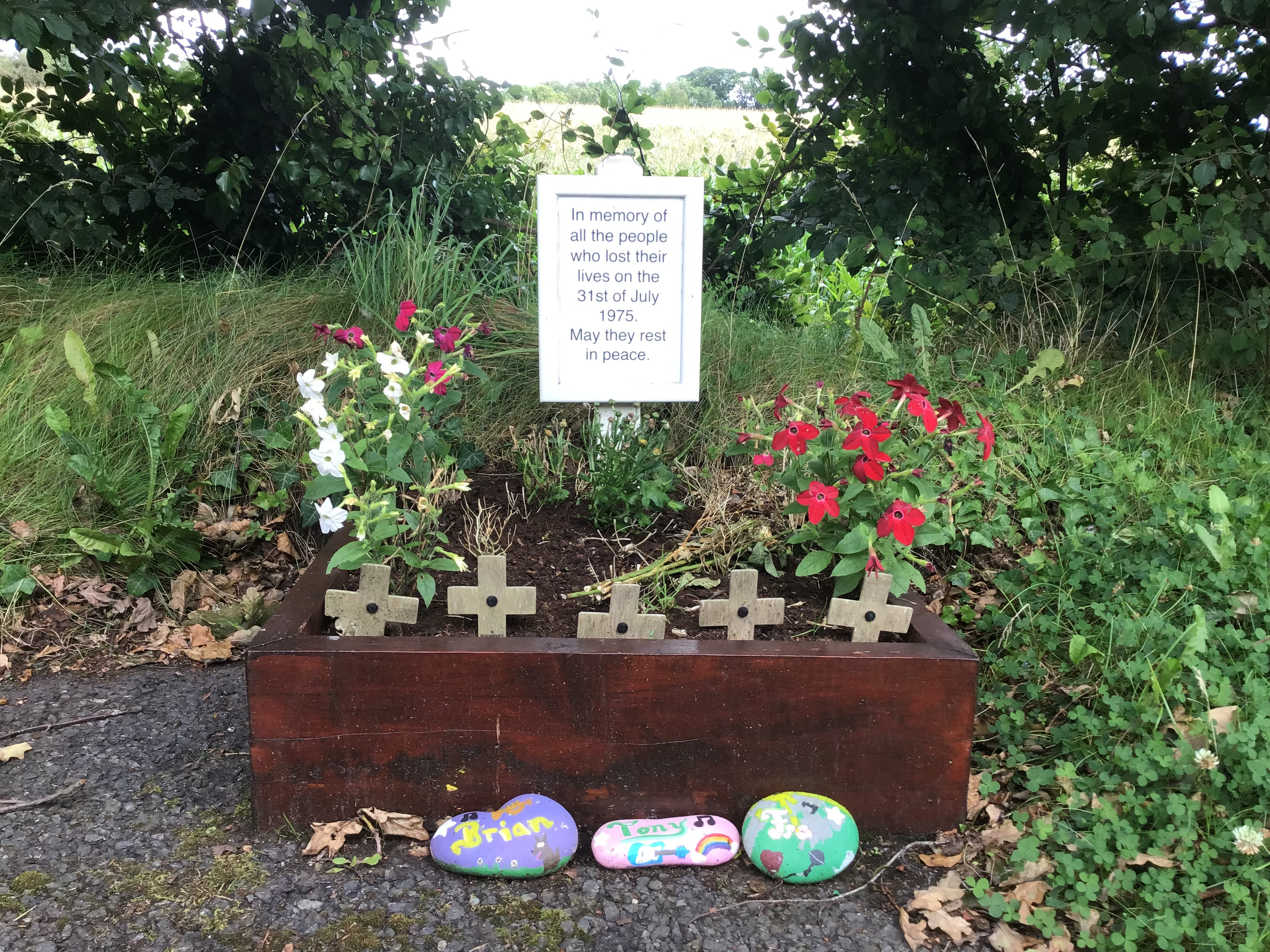
The small memorial at the scene of the murders, which commemorates all five men who died.

A monument dedicated to the deceased showband members was unveiled at a ceremony at Parnell Square North, Dublin, on 10 December 2007. Survivors Stephen Travers and Des McAlea were both present at the unveiling, as was Taoiseach Bertie Ahern, who made a tribute. The monument, entitled Let's Dance, is made of limestone, bronze and granite, by County Donegal sculptor Redmond Herrity, and is at the site of the old National Ballroom, where the band often played.

A mural and memorial plaque to Harris Boyle and Wesley Somerville is in the Killycomain Estate in Portadown, where Boyle had lived. The plaque describes them as having been "killed in action."

In a report on Nairac's alleged involvement in the massacre, published in the Sunday Mirror newspaper on 16 May 1999, Colin Wills called the ambush "one of the worst atrocities in the 30-year history of the Troubles." Irish Times diarist Frank McNally summed up the massacre as "an incident that encapsulated all the madness of the time." In 2011, journalist Kevin Myers denounced the attack with the following statement: "[I]n its diabolical inventiveness against such a group of harmless and naïve young men, it is easily one of the most depraved [of the Troubles]."

A postage stamp was issued in Ireland on 22 September 2010 commemorating the Miami Showband. The 55-cent stamp, designed with a 1967 publicity photograph of the band, included two of the slain members, Fran O'Toole and Brian McCoy, as part of the line-up when Dickie Rock was the frontman. It was one of a series of four stamps issued by An Post, celebrating the "golden age of the Irish showband era from the 1950s to the 1970s."

Near the anniversaries of the event, a temporary commemorative plaque and flowers are placed at the location of the killings.

The band is remembered in the song The Miami by English folk singer-songwriter Jez Lowe on his album Jack Common's Anthem.

== The HET Report ==
The Historical Enquiries Team (HET), which was set up to investigate controversial Troubles-related deaths, released its report on the Miami Showband killings to the victims' families in December 2011. The HET said the killings raised "disturbing questions about collusive and corrupt behaviour."

The findings noted in the report confirmed Mid-Ulster UVF leader Robin Jackson's involvement and identified him as an RUC Special Branch agent. According to the report, Jackson had claimed during police interrogations that after the shootings, a senior RUC officer had advised him to "lie low." Although this information was passed on to RUC headquarters, nothing was done about it. In the police statement made following his arrest for possession of the silencer and Luger on 31 May 1976, Jackson maintained that a week before he was taken into custody, two RUC officers had tipped him off about the discovery of his fingerprints on the silencer; he also claimed they had forewarned him: "I should clear as there was a wee job up the country that I would be done for and there was no way out of it for me." Although ballistic testing had linked the Luger (for which the silencer had been specifically made) to the attack, Jackson was never questioned about the killings after his fingerprints had been discovered, and the Miami inquiry team were never informed about these developments. Jackson died of cancer on 30 May 1998, aged 49.

The victims' families held a press conference in Dublin after the report was released. When asked to comment about the report, McAlea replied: "It's been a long time but we've got justice at last." He did, however, express his concern over the fact that nobody was ever charged with his attempted murder and that none of the perpetrators ever offered him an apology. Travers decried: "We believe the only conclusion possible arising from the HET report is that one of the most prolific loyalist murderers of the conflict was an RUC Special Branch agent and was involved in the Miami Showband attack."

== Documentary ==
A Netflix documentary titled ReMastered: The Miami Showband Massacre was released on 22 March 2019, highlighting the efforts of Stephen Travers to track down who authorized the attack, for what purposes, and to get an admission of culpability.

== See also ==
- List of massacres in Ireland
- List of massacres in the United Kingdom
- Kingsmill massacre – A 1976 massacre of civilians who had also been travelling in a minibus
- Timeline of Ulster Volunteer Force actions
