= Moygashel =

Village near Dungannon, Northern Ireland

Coordinates: 54.48452°N 6.75296°W

Moygashel: Irish: Maigh gCaisil
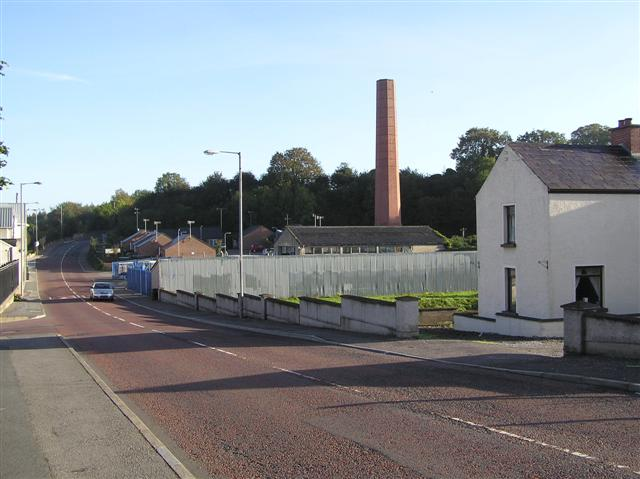

- Location within Northern Ireland
- Irish grid reference: H809603
  - Belfast: 40 mi (64 km)
- District: Mid Ulster
- County: County Tyrone
- Country: Northern Ireland
- Sovereign state: United Kingdom
- Post town: DUNGANNON
- Postcode district: BT71
- Dialling code: 028
- UK Parliament: Fermanagh & South Tyrone
- NI Assembly: Fermanagh & South Tyrone

Moygashel (from Irish Maigh gCaisil, meaning 'plain of the stone fort') is a small village and townland in County Tyrone, Northern Ireland. It is near the southern edge of Dungannon. Although the village's name is pronounced /mɔɪˈɡæʃəl/ (moy-gashel), the trademark of the Irish linen named after it is pronounced /ˈmɔɪɡəʃəl/ (moy-ga-shell).

Moygashel is predominantly Protestant with 93% of its population recorded as being Protestant in a 2021 census. 2% of the village is Catholic and 5% is recorded as "other" or "none". 4% of the population were born outside of the UK or Ireland, compared to 26% in the wider Dungannon area. 98% are white, compared to 86% in the wider Dungannon area.

== People ==
One of the bombers killed in the Miami Showband massacre, Wesley Somerville—who was an Ulster Volunteer Force (UVF) and Ulster Defence Regiment (UDR) member, and member of the Glennane gang—was from Moygashel. He is commemorated by a plaque and banner in the village.

In 2017, a spokesperson from the Moygashel Residents' Association was quoted as saying, "We are a Protestant village, he is part of the culture of the village. He is not a terrorist; he never was a terrorist as far as this village is concerned and that is not glorifying anything."

In April 2025, a Loyalist parade in Somerville's honour through Moygashel attracted hundreds of supporters and thirty bands.

== 2025 bonfire controversy ==
A Loyalist bonfire with effigies of refugees in a boat drew widespread criticism. There are more than a dozen life-sized effigies in the boat, wearing lifejackets. Beneath the boat are banners reading "stop the boats" and "veterans before refugees". The bonfire is scheduled to be burned on 10 July.

On 10 July an Irish tricolour was added to the bonfire. The Police Service of Northern Ireland said they were investigating a hate incident on the outskirts of Dungannon related to the bonfire. The fire was lit late on the night of 10 July.

=== Condemnations ===
Patrick Corrigan, director of Amnesty International's Northern Ireland branch, described it as a "vile, dehumanising act that fuels hatred and racism". He said the bonfire "cruelly mocks the suffering of people who risk everything to flee war, persecution, and hardship in search of safety" and "Beyond being morally reprehensible, it incites hostility toward already marginalised and vulnerable communities. Amnesty International urges the authorities to ensure its immediate removal and calls on the PSNI to investigate and hold those responsible to account". He also said, "a clear and unequivocal message" must be sent that "xenophobia and incitement to hatred have no place in our society".

Colm Gildernew, Sinn Féin MLA for Fermanagh and South Tyrone, condemned the bonfire as "vile" and "despicable". He also said, "This is an absolutely disgusting act, fuelled by sickening racist and far-right attitudes" and "This is a clear incitement to hatred and must be removed immediately. Those who come to our island to make it their home are not the enemy. They are our friends, our neighbours, and are welcomed, cherished and valued by the vast majority of people here. Political leaders in this area must step up, call for the removal of these offensive materials and make it clear they do not support such vile, deplorable views."

Claire Hanna, leader of the SDLP, condemned the bonfire saying some involved were motivated by "hate, confrontation and media rows" and tweeted "Intricate effigies of humans beings, for burning. Who is this for?". SDLP councillor Malachy Quinn reported the bonfire to the police and he said, "Those responsible for this hateful display claim to be celebrating British culture," he said. Let's be clear, racism and intimidation are not culture. This isn't pride, it's poison.".

Alliance councillor Eddie Roofe said the bonfire was "despicable" and "Those responsible only seek to incite fear and spread far-right beliefs and do not represent the community as a whole".

Gaelle Gormley, integration and welfare officer of the North West Migrants Forum, described it as "outrageous" and "really disgraceful". She also said, "We even had goosebumps of fear" and "It is a call for hate. Our service users are mostly asylum seekers and refugees, and they are very scared and they are really disappointed." She called for the PSNI to take it down.

Church of Ireland Archbishop of Armagh John McDowell described the effigies as "racist, threatening and offensive" and added "It certainly has nothing whatsoever to do with Christianity or with Protestant culture and is in fact inhuman and deeply sub-Christian. I hope that the many people from other countries, who live in that area, and who contribute so much to the economy and to the diversity of Dungannon, can be reassured that it does not in any way represent the feeling of the vast majority of their neighbours."

Mike Nesbitt, leader of the Ulster Unionist Party, described it as "deplorable" and "sickening" and said "entirely out of step with what is supposed to be a cultural celebration". He also said "I condemn it without reservation and urge those responsible to remove it forthwith".

The Democratic Unionist Party said "placing of flags, effigies or other items on bonfires is not part of that tradition and should not take place".

=== Support ===
Moygashel Bonfire Committee denied that the bonfire was "racist, threatening or offensive", claiming it was a protest against illegal immigration. Jamie Bryson claimed it was a form of "artistic protest".

== 2026 bonfire controversy ==
On 9 July 2026, During an Ulster Protestant loyalist bonfire for the Eleventh Night in Moygashel, a mosque replica was burned. Signs saying "secure our borders" and "end the threat of radical Islam" were also placed on the pyre.

In September 2026 three men were charged in connection with the model of the mosque placed on the bonfire. They were charged that on 8 July 2026 they displayed written material that was threatening, abusive or insulting, intending to stir up hatred or arouse fear contrary to Article 9(1) of the Public Order (Northern Ireland) Order 1987. All three had previously been on police bail, they then left the court on ₤250 court bail. A fourth man will appear in court on 23 September, with all four men being tried together.
