= Harris Boyle =

Northern Irish loyalist (1953–1975)

- Born: 1953; Portadown, County Armagh, Northern Ireland
- Died: 31 July 1975 (aged 21–22); Buskhill, County Down, Northern Ireland
- Military career
- Allegiance: Ulster Volunteer Force (UVF); British Army (Ulster Defence Regiment)
- Rank: Major (UVF)
- Unit: Mid-Ulster Brigade (UVF)
- Conflict: The Troubles

Harris Boyle (1953 – 31 July 1975) was an Ulster Defence Regiment (UDR) soldier and a high-ranking member of the Ulster Volunteer Force (UVF), a Northern Irish loyalist paramilitary organisation. Boyle was implicated in the 1974 Dublin and Monaghan bombings, and took part in the attack at Buskhill, County Down -- when an armed UVF gang wearing British Army uniforms ambushed The Miami Showband at a bogus military checkpoint. The popular Irish cabaret band was driving home to Dublin after a performance in Banbridge. He was one of two gunmen killed when the bomb they were loading onto the band's minibus exploded prematurely. He is sometimes referred to as Horace Boyle.

== Ulster Volunteer Force and UDR link ==
Boyle was born in Portadown, County Armagh, and grew up in the working-class Killycomain estate. He was raised as a Protestant and attended Edenderry Primary School. On an unknown date, Boyle joined both the Portadown company of the UDR as a part-time member and the Portadown unit of the UVF Mid-Ulster Brigade. He held the rank of major in the latter organisation, which at the time was commanded by Billy Hanna. Despite a vetting process, joint membership of the UDR and loyalist paramilitary organisations was common. Paramilitaries joined to obtain weapons, training and intelligence.

Vetting procedures were carried out jointly by the military Intelligence Corps and the Royal Ulster Constabulary's Special Branch. If no intelligence was found to suggest unsuitability, individuals were passed for recruitment and would remain as soldiers until the commanding officer was provided with intelligence enabling him to remove soldiers with paramilitary links or sympathies.

The Hidden Hand: The Forgotten Massacre documentary about the Dublin and Monaghan bombings which was broadcast by Yorkshire Television in 1993 maintained that Boyle was second-in-command to Hanna. The brigade formed part of what later became known as the Glenanne gang. This was a violent loyalist group which operated out of a farm owned by RUC reservist James Mitchell, and comprised rogue elements of Northern Ireland's security forces as well as the UVF and to a lesser extent, the Ulster Defence Association (UDA). This loose alliance carried out sectarian attacks and killings of Catholics, often, although not always, those seen as upwardly mobile, during the 1970s.

Boyle was charged with the possession of weapons and ammunition in suspicious circumstances on 9 September 1972 when he was 19 years old. He was implicated in the Dublin and Monaghan bombings of 17 May 1974. RUC Special Patrol Group officer John Weir named Billy Hanna, Robin Jackson and Davy Payne (UDA) as having planned and led one of the UVF teams that drove three bomb cars into Dublin's city centre during evening rush hour, killing 26 people. His allegations were published in 2003 in the Barron Report which was the findings of the official investigation into the bombings by Irish Supreme Court Justice Barron. According to submissions received by Mr. Justice Barron, the Monaghan bomb (which exploded 90 minutes after the Dublin bombs), was assembled at Boyle's home in Festival Road in the Killycomain estate.

Hidden Hand reported that Boyle (along with Jackson and Hanna) was run as an agent by Captain Robert Nairac, the Military Intelligence Liaison officer attached to 14th Intelligence Company. The programme named Boyle as one of the prime suspects in the Dublin car bombings. Former British soldier and psychological warfare operative Colin Wallace confirmed that Boyle had "close social links" to Captain Nairac. John Weir alleged that Boyle was part of the Glenanne gang who shot a PIRA volunteer (John Francis Green) dead near Castleblaney, County Monaghan on 10 January 1975.

== Miami Showband attack ==
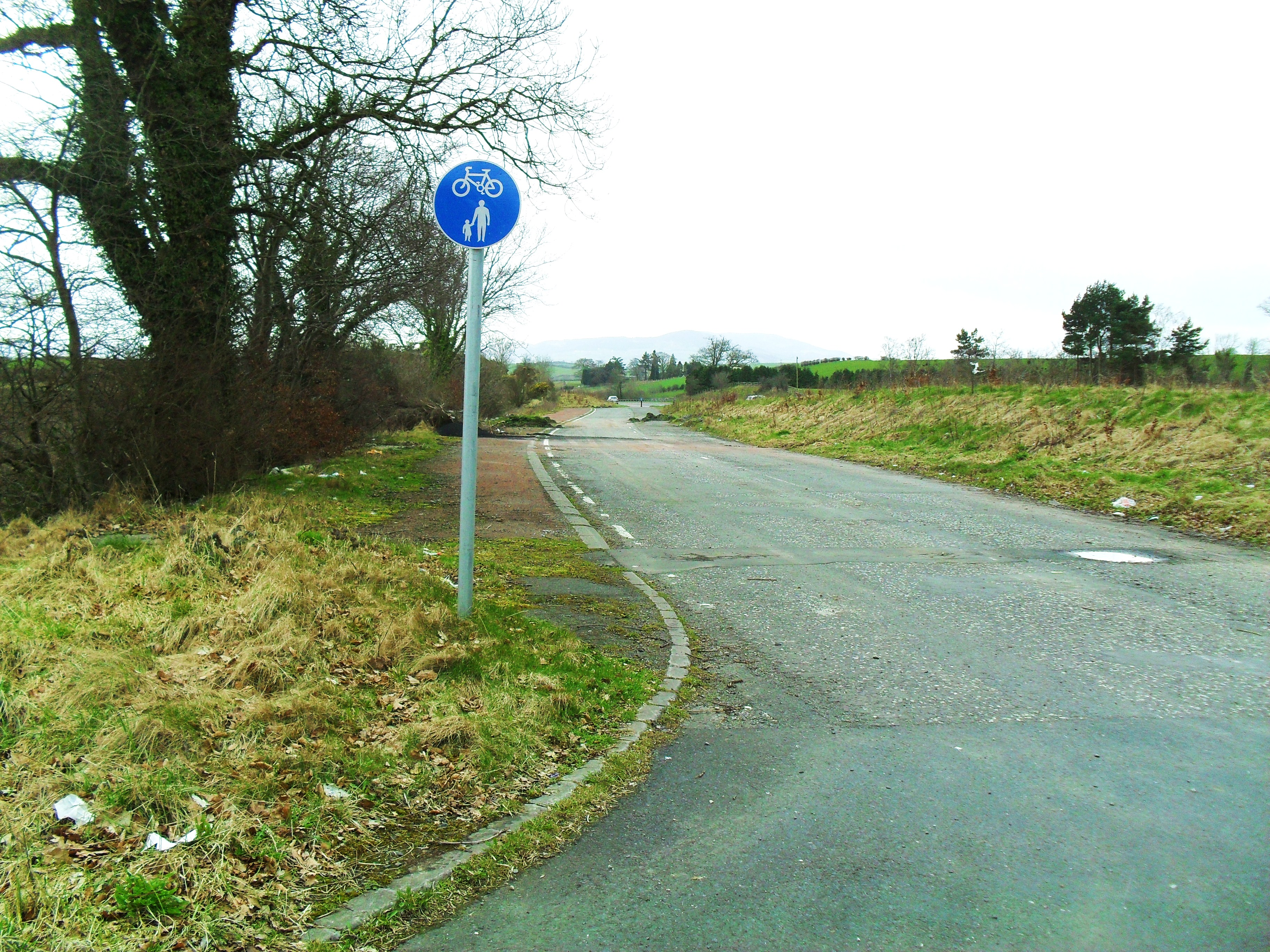
Site of the Miami Showband attack where Harris Boyle was accidentally blown up after he and another UVF gunman placed a time bomb onto the band's minibus which had been parked in the lay-by behind the sign

Boyle was one of the Mid-Ulster Brigade UVF gang that carried out the attack against the popular Irish cabaret band, the Miami Showband on 31 July 1975. Author Martin Dillon suggested in his book God and the Gun: the Church and Irish Terrorism that Boyle was one of the leaders of the unit. At about 2.30 a.m., as the band was returning home to Dublin from a performance at the Castle Ballroom in Banbridge, their minibus (driven by trumpeter Brian McCoy) was stopped on the A-1 road at Buskhill, seven miles (11 km) north of Newry, at a bogus military checkpoint by UVF gunmen dressed in British Army uniforms. At least four of the other men, like Boyle, were serving members of the UDR. The band members were lined up with their hands on their heads facing a ditch and asked to give their names and addresses.

Saxophonist Des McAlea, who survived the attack, later testified that Boyle had become angry at some of the other gunmen who had joked with the band members about the success of their performance that night. At this point, Boyle and Wesley Somerville went to the front of the minibus and placed a ten-pound time bomb under the driver's seat. This was meant to explode as the band drove through either Newry or after they reached the Republic of Ireland, killing all five band members on board. According to The Dirty War by Martin Dillon, the plan behind the UVF bombing was to portray the band members as republicans smuggling explosives for the Provisional IRA. As the device tilted on its side, clumsy soldering on the clock which was used as a timer came apart and the bomb detonated prematurely. The bus was blown in half. The two loyalists, both at the centre of the explosion, took the full force of the blast and were killed instantly with their bodies hurled in opposite directions. Boyle's body landed in the road, fifty yards away from the front half of the destroyed vehicle. It was ripped in two and badly burned. Both men were decapitated and dismembered; one limbless torso was completely charred. Survivor Stephen Travers later saw a photograph of one of the dead men and described it: "He didn't have any head, just a black torso, no head, legs or arms." A severed arm with the tattoo "UVF Portadown" was later found a hundred yards from the scene. Boyle was 22 years old at the time of his death. He was unmarried and worked as a telephone wireman.

The remaining UVF gunmen opened fire on the Miami Showband members who had been blown down into the field below the level of the road. Three of the band members were killed: trumpeter Brian McCoy, guitarist Tony Geraghty, and lead singer Fran O'Toole. Saxophone player Des McAlea and bassist Stephen Travers were both wounded, the latter having been shot with dum-dum bullets. Several days before the Showband attack, Mid-Ulster UVF leader Billy Hanna was shot dead, allegedly by Robin Jackson, who assumed command of the brigade. According to authors and journalists Martin Dillon, Paul Larkin and Joe Tiernan, Boyle had accompanied Jackson when the latter shot Hanna outside his home in Lurgan. Weir maintained that Jackson was an RUC Special Branch agent.

An international panel of inquiry (headed by Professor Douglass Cassel, formerly of Northwestern University School of Law), commissioned by the Pat Finucane Centre to investigate allegations of collusion between loyalist paramilitaries and the security forces, concluded there was credible evidence that Jackson was the principal perpetrator of the Miami Showband killings. Although questioned afterwards by the RUC, he never faced charges. Two serving UDR soldiers and one former UDR soldier: Lance-Corporal Thomas Crozier, Sergeant James McDowell, and John James Somerville (brother of Wesley) were given life sentences for the killings. At the time the Miami Showband attack occurred, the UVF was not an illegal organisation, the ban against them having been lifted in April 1974, by Merlyn Rees, Secretary of State for Northern Ireland. The UVF would be proscribed by the British Government again in October 1975.

== Aftermath ==
Within 12 hours of the attack, the UVF issued the following statement giving an account of the event:

A UVF patrol led by Major Boyle was suspicious of two vehicles, a minibus and a car parked near the border. Major Boyle ordered his patrol to apprehend the occupants for questioning. As they were being questioned, Major Boyle and Lieutenant Somerville began to search the minibus. As they began to enter the vehicle, a bomb was detonated and both men were killed outright. At the precise moment of the explosion, the patrol came under intense automatic fire from the occupants of the other vehicle. The patrol sergeant immediately ordered fire to be returned. Using self-loading rifles and sub-machine guns, the patrol returned fire killing three of their attackers and wounding another. The patrol later recovered two Armalite rifles and a pistol. The UVF maintains regular border patrols due to the continued activity of the Provisional IRA. The Mid-Ulster Battalion has been assisting South Down-South Armagh units since the IRA Forkhill boobytrap which killed four British soldiers. Three UVF members are being treated for gunshot wounds after last night but not in hospital.

It would appear that the UVF patrol surprised members of a terrorist organization transferring weapons the Miami Showband minibus and that an explosive device of some description was being carried by the Showband for an unlawful purpose. It is obvious, therefore, that the UVF patrol was justified in taking the action it did and that the killing of the three Showband members should be regarded as justifiable homicide. The Officers and Agents of the Ulster Central Intelligence Agency commend the UVF on their actions and tender their deepest sympathy to the relatives of the two Officers who died while attempting to remove the bomb from the minibus.

Boyle and Somerville were given UVF paramilitary funerals, complete with gun volleys. Eight women dressed in black walked in front of the cortege. The service was conducted by Free Presbyterian minister William McCrea, a Democratic Unionist (DUP) politician. The UVF journal Combat published sympathy letters from both the "A" Company of the 9th Battalion, Ulster Defence Regiment and the Protestant Action Force, a cover name used by the UVF.

Two weeks after the Miami Showband attack, a popular Portadown disc jockey Norman "Mooch" Kerr (aged 28) was shot dead by an IRA gunman as he was packing up his equipment after a show he had put on at the Camrick Bar in Armagh. Although not a member of any loyalist paramilitary organisation, he had been a friend of Boyle and the two were often seen together. Boyle had occasionally helped Kerr run his mobile disco. The IRA claimed it killed Kerr because he was an associate of Robert Nairac.

According to Martin Dillon, Boyle and Wesley Somerville served as role models for Loyalist Volunteer Force (LVF) leader Billy Wright, and it was their violent deaths which motivated him to join the UVF in 1975. Wright took over the Mid-Ulster UVF Brigade from Robin Jackson in the early 1990s before going on to form the LVF. The RTÉ programme Today Tonight aired a 1987 documentary in which it was claimed that former UVF associates of Boyle revealed to the programme that Nairac detonated the bomb deliberately at Buskhill in order to eliminate Boyle, with whom he had carried out the Green assassination. Sunday Tribune journalist Emily O'Reilly noted that none of the three men convicted of the Miami Showband killings ever implicated Nairac in the attack or accused him of causing Boyle's death.

There is a mural and memorial plaque dedicated to Boyle in Portadown's Killycomain housing estate, where he had grown up. About 100 people, 16 loyalist bands and a UVF guard of honour were present at the mural's unveiling on 30 July 2005, following a parade through the estate. The plaque describes Boyle as having been "killed in action", which he was not.

== See also ==
- Glenanne gang
- Billy Hanna
- Wesley Somerville

== Other sources ==
- Ryder, Chris (1991) The Ulster Defence Regiment: An Instrument of Peace?; ISBN 0-413-64800-1
