= Billy Hanna =

Northern Ireland loyalist (d. 1975)

- Billy Hanna, MM
- Born: William Henry Wilson Hanna c. 1929; Lurgan, County Armagh, Northern Ireland
- Died: 27 July 1975 (aged 46); Lurgan
- Military career
- Allegiance: Ulster Defence Regiment; Ulster Volunteer Force
- Rank: Lance-corporal (RUR); Sergeant (UDR); Brigade commander (UVF)
- Units: Royal Ulster Rifles; The North Irish Militia (4 RIR); C (Lurgan) Company, 11th Battalion UDR
- Conflict: Korean War; The Troubles
- Awards: Military Medal

William Henry Wilson Hanna, MM (c. 1929 – 27 July 1975), was a high-ranking Ulster loyalist who founded and led the Mid-Ulster Brigade of the Ulster Volunteer Force (UVF) until he was killed, allegedly by Robin Jackson, who took over command of the brigade.

Hanna had been awarded the Military Medal (MM) for gallantry while serving with the British Army's Royal Ulster Rifles in the Korean War. He then joined the Territorial Army and later the Ulster Special Constabulary (USC). When the latter was disbanded in 1970, he joined the newly formed Ulster Defence Regiment (UDR), a locally recruited infantry regiment of the British Army, as a part-time member. He held the rank of sergeant in C (Lurgan) Company, 11th Battalion UDR, and served as a permanent staff instructor (PSI).

According to Royal Ulster Constabulary (RUC) Special Patrol Group (RUC) officer John Weir, Hanna was a leader of one of the two UVF units that planned and carried out the Dublin car bombings on 17 May 1974, which killed 26 people. Former British soldier and psychological warfare operative Colin Wallace suggested that Hanna had been the principal organiser of the Dublin attacks. Journalist Joe Tiernan confirmed this and stated that he had also directed the Monaghan bombing which occurred that same evening and claimed an additional seven lives.

== Military career ==
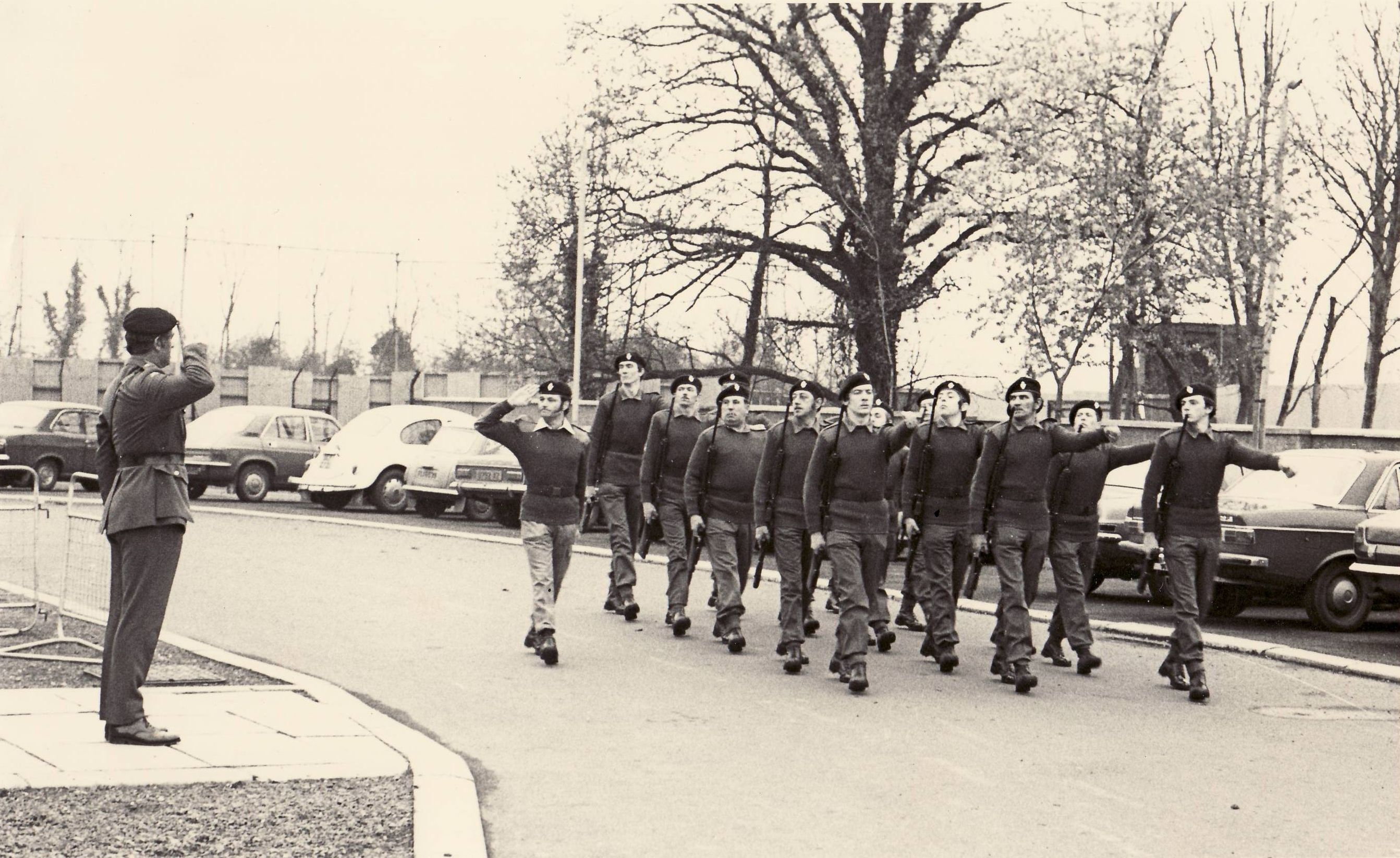
A platoon of 11th Battalion Ulster Defence Regiment soldiers march past their commanding officer at Mahon Road Barracks, Portadown. Billy Hanna served as a sergeant and permanent staff instructor in C (Lurgan) Company, 11 UDR

Billy Hanna was born in Lurgan, County Armagh, Northern Ireland, in about 1929, and brought up as an Ulster Protestant. He was the son of William Armstrong Hanna and Anna Jane Lavery. According to journalist David McKittrick in his book Lost Lives, Hanna at an early age became "obsessed with guns and military paraphernalia in general".

He began his military career in the British Army, serving in the Royal Ulster Rifles where he held the rank of lance-corporal. He was awarded the Military Medal (MM) for gallantry during the Korean War.

After Hanna left the regular Army, he joined the North Irish Militia, Territorial Army unit (TA), and later the Ulster Special Constabulary (USC), commonly known as the B Specials, which was a reserve police force in Northern Ireland. Upon their disbandment in May 1970, he then became a part-time member of the newly formed Ulster Defence Regiment (UDR).

He was in 2 UDR's C (Lurgan) Company before it became C Company, 11th Battalion Ulster Defence Regiment (C Coy, 11 UDR), in 1972. He served as a permanent staff instructor (PSI), holding the rank of sergeant, although he was for a time weapons instructor at 2 UDR's base in Gough Barracks in Armagh. According to David McKittrick and UDR historian John Potter, Hanna was dismissed from the UDR after serving two years as a sergeant "for UVF activity"; however, authors Malcolm Sutton and Martin Dillon suggested he was still a member of the regiment at the time of his death. His brother Gordon served as a full-time member of the UDR.

Members of militant groups such as the Ulster Volunteer Force (UVF) and Ulster Defence Association (UDA) managed to join the UDR despite the vetting process. Their purpose in doing so was to obtain weapons, training and intelligence. Vetting procedures were carried out jointly by British military intelligence and the RUC's Special Branch, and, if no intelligence was found to suggest unsuitability, individuals were passed for recruitment and would remain as soldiers until the commanding officer was provided with intelligence enabling him to remove soldiers with paramilitary links or sympathies. With his previous military experience and decoration for bravery, Hanna was just the type of recruit needed. He would have been fast tracked on a refresher course to sharpen up his military skills, and would have been part of the UDR's front line of experienced soldiers when the regiment began duties in 1970. In the regimental history of the UDR the author commented on men like him and (referring to another individual) suggested that, "he may have regarded himself as a true blue loyalist but had so little understanding of the meaning of loyalty that he would betray his regiment and his comrades....."

== UVF Mid-Ulster Brigade ==
In the late 1960s, the violent religious and political conflict known as the Troubles broke out in Northern Ireland. Many people from both sides of the religious/political divide were caught up in the violence that ensued. Hanna was no exception as attacks waged by the Provisional IRA escalated in the early 1970s, and many Ulster loyalists in Northern Ireland, feeling that their status was being threatened and the state response insufficient, sought to retaliate with illegal violence by joining one of the two main loyalist paramilitary organisations, the legal UDA or the illegal UVF. Up until his death in 1975, Hanna was the leader of the Mid-Ulster Brigade of the UVF, having established the brigade and set up the first unit in his home town of Lurgan in 1972. Hanna appointed himself 'brigade commander' and his leadership was endorsed by the UVF's supreme commander, Gusty Spence. On 23 October of that same year, an armed UVF gang raided King's Park camp, a UDR/Territorial Army depot in Lurgan, and stole a large cache of sophisticated guns and ammunition. Hanna was the depot's guard commander when the raid took place.

A member of the UVF's Brigade Staff (Belfast leadership) on the Shankill Road, Hanna was described by journalist Joe Tiernan as having been a "brilliant strategist and an able leader". Hanna's place on the Brigade Staff was remarkable in itself because, since the formation of the modern UVF by Gusty Spence, almost all of the UVF Brigade Staff members have been from the Shankill Road or the neighbouring Woodvale area to the west. Hanna, a native of Lurgan, was one of the few exceptions. A Garda Síochána document dating from 1974 to 1975 revealed that the Republic of Ireland's police knew Hanna was the Officer Commanding (OC) of the Mid-Ulster Brigade's Lurgan unit. Tiernan alleged that Hanna personally recruited and trained young men from the Lurgan and Portadown areas who were "prepared to defend Ulster at any cost". Directed by Hanna, the brigade became the most lethal loyalist paramilitary group operating in mid-Ulster. He then began carrying out bank and post office robberies, and intimidated local businessmen into paying protection money to the Mid-Ulster UVF.

Hanna's Mid-Ulster unit was part of the group of loyalist extremists known as the Glenanne gang, comprising members of the RUC, UDR, UDA as well as the UVF, which carried out sectarian attacks in the 1970s in the area of south Armagh and mid-Ulster referred to as the "murder triangle". The gang was allegedly controlled by the RUC Special Branch and/or British Military Intelligence. The name is derived from a farm in Glenanne, County Armagh (owned by James Mitchell, an RUC reservist), which was used as a UVF arms dump and bomb-making site. According to the 2003 Barron Report, it was Hanna who had first obtained Mitchell's permission for the UVF to use his land to store weapons and assemble bombs.

In November 1973, Hanna was arrested after his home in Lurgan was searched by the RUC. He was charged with the possession of a round of ammunition and two six-volt batteries wired together which were found during the search. The Defence counsel described Hanna as a "former British Army soldier with a distinguished career in the Royal Ulster Rifles, having served in the Korean War".

Former British soldier and Troubles' writer Ken Wharton suggested in Wasted Years, Wasted Lives, Volume 1, his 2013 book, that the accusations against Hanna having been involved in loyalist paramilitary activities were unsubstantiated.

== Dublin and Monaghan bombings ==
=== Planning and preparation ===
RUC Special Patrol Group officer John Weir named Hanna, along with senior UVF member Robin Jackson and Davy Payne (UDA Belfast), as having led one of the two teams that bombed Dublin on 17 May 1974. Weir additionally alleged that Hanna had been the main organiser of the attacks. Weir did not join the Glenanne gang until after Hanna's death; so it was highly unlikely that they had ever met. Weir maintained he had received the information of Hanna's central role in the Dublin bombings from James Mitchell. His allegations were published in 2003 in the Barron Report, which was the findings of the official investigation into the bombings by Irish Supreme Court Justice Henry Barron.

The 1993 Yorkshire Television documentary, The Hidden Hand: The Forgotten Massacre also named Hanna as having been part of the Dublin bombing unit. The idea to bomb Dublin had been conceived and authorised by the UVF leadership, and the planning of the proposed car bombings took place in Belfast, Lurgan, and Portadown throughout the end of 1973 and early 1974. Hanna was allegedly put in charge of the operation and carefully chose the team of bombers who would assist him in the attacks. The men were all experts in their own field and drawn from the Mid-Ulster and Belfast brigades. Joe Tiernan claimed that Hanna appointed William Fulton as quartermaster for the bombings, but he did not indicate his source for the information. The Barron Report alleged that two months before the car bombings, instructions in making bombs were given by Hanna on Monday evenings, and that his name was on the Garda and RUC lists of suspects for the Dublin bombings.

It was stated in the Barron Report that former British soldier and psychological warfare operative Colin Wallace also suggested that Hanna had been the principal organiser of the Dublin car bombings. The attacks took place on the third day of the Ulster Workers' Council Strike. This was a general strike in Northern Ireland called by hard-line loyalists and unionists who opposed the Sunningdale Agreement and the Northern Ireland Assembly which had proposed their sharing political power with nationalists and planned a greater role for the Republic of Ireland in the governance of Northern Ireland. The UVF deliberately timed the bombings to coincide with the strike. At the time the bombings occurred, the UVF was legal; the proscription against the organisation had been lifted on 4 April 1974 by Merlyn Rees, Secretary of State for Northern Ireland in an effort to bring the UVF into the democratic process. It would once more be banned by the British Government on 3 October 1975.

In July 1993, a Garda detective received information from a reliable source that on 15 May 1974, a meeting had taken place inside the Portadown Golf Club in connection with the Ulster Workers' Council (UWC) strike; the same informer added that a separate meeting was held in the club which was attended by Hanna and Samuel Whitten, a suspect in the Monaghan bombing. Hanna and Whitten were both regular customers at the golf club and were often accompanied by RUC officers.

Tiernan said in his book, The Dublin Bombings and the Murder Triangle, that the Monaghan bombing, which took place 90 minutes after the Dublin explosions, was executed by loyalists working under the direction of Hanna. According to Tiernan, a few days before the bombing, Hanna had visited a pub in Portadown to check that everything was in place for the operation to be carried out. The Monaghan bombing had been organised as a diversionary tactic to draw Gardaí away from the border, enabling the bombers to cross back into Northern Ireland undetected. According to submissions received by Mr. Justice Barron, the Monaghan bomb was assembled at the home of high-ranking UVF member Harris Boyle in Portadown.

=== Alleged links to Military Intelligence ===
It was alleged by Tiernan that Hanna was used as an agent by British Military Intelligence, and that his Army handlers often took Hanna on fishing trips to the Corbet Lough outside Banbridge. Middle-ranking officers of the Intelligence Corps based at Army headquarters in Lisburn were frequent visitors to his Houston Park home in Lurgan's Mourneview estate. They provided him with weapons and petrol for his car. He also invited regular soldiers to his house for "cups of tea". Tiernan also stated that he discovered through personal contacts with former UVF associates of Hanna the names of four British Army officers and one RUC Special Branch officer who helped him plan the 1974 car bombings and who were also involved in earlier attacks in Dublin which had taken place in 1972 and 1973. These UVF men, from the Portadown and Lurgan areas as well as Belfast, had taken part in the Dublin and Monaghan attacks; they all confirmed that Hanna was the mastermind behind the bombings and that army officers were involved in the operation. On pages 89 and 90 of his book, The Dublin Bombings and the Murder Triangle, Tiernan wrote

One former UVF man now in his seventies, who was a member of Billy's squad and whom Gardai named as having been involved in the Dublin bombings, told me during research for this book that Billy worked as a UVF agent for army intelligence officers in Lisburn. He said two middle-ranking officers in plain clothes travelled down from Lisburn once a fortnight in a van to meet Billy and give him instructions on what they wanted done. They would visit his house from time to time and they took him fishing to Banbridge. I saw them in his house a couple of times through the window as I approached but as no member of the unit was allowed to meet them I turned and went home and saw Billy later. But mostly they met him away from his house in carparks or the like. They would meet him in Portadown, Lurgan, Banbridge or out the country somewhere. Occasionally when our unit met to plan operations someone might ask Billy a question about some aspect of the operation. If Billy did not know the answer his reply would be: 'I'll have to take advice on that'. No one pushed the matter further but everyone knew Billy was talking about the army.

Former Military Intelligence officer Fred Holroyd claimed that Hanna had contact with a Field Intelligence Non-Commissioned Officer (FINCO) who reported to Holroyd. He wasn't certain whether his FINCO was working Hanna as an agent or seeking to gain his friendship in the hope of acquiring information.

Colin Wallace stated that he was told in 1974 that Hanna worked for British Army 3 Brigade.

=== The attacks ===
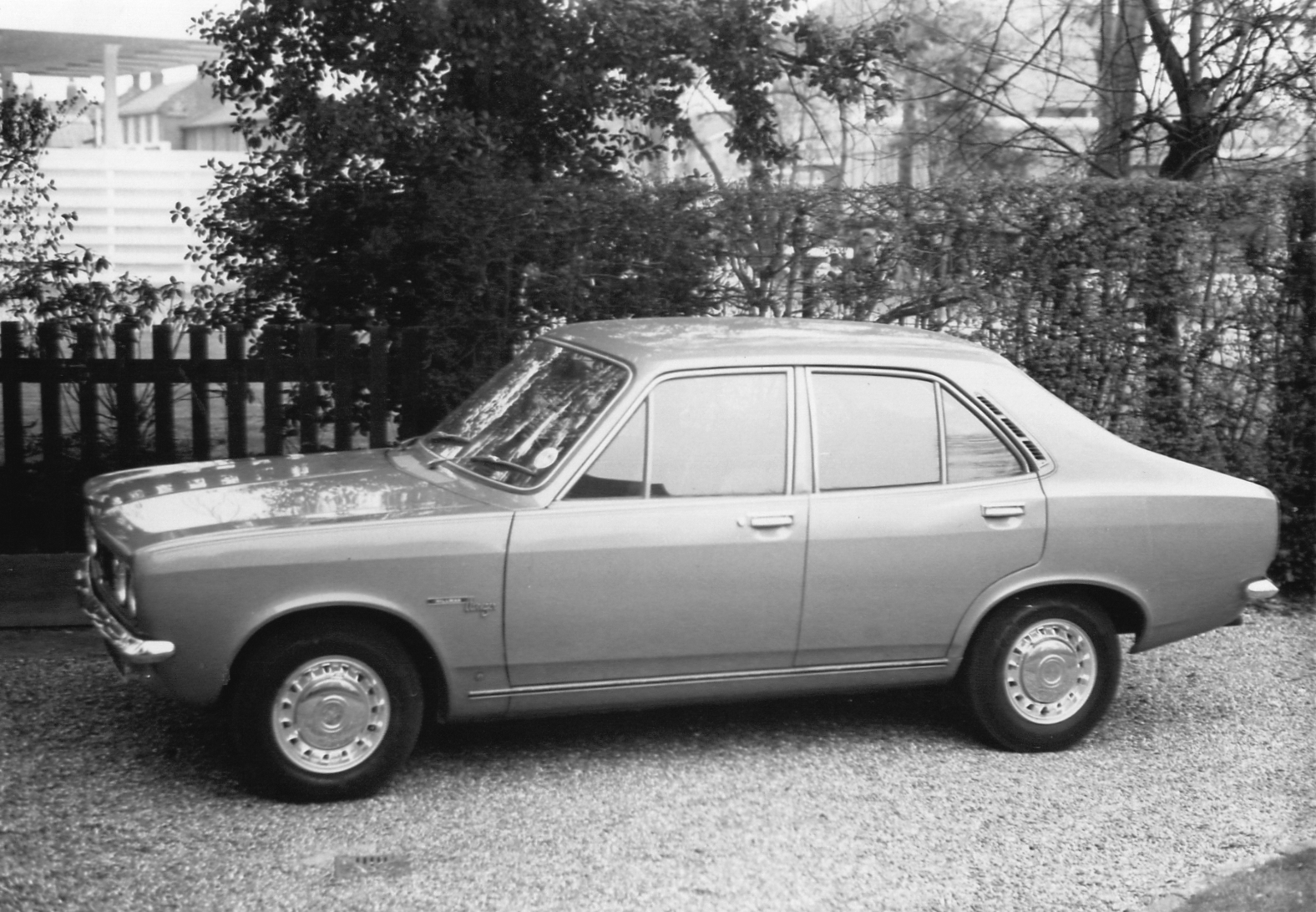
The car bomb which exploded in Parnell Street, Dublin was a green 1970 model Hillman Avenger like the one shown here. Hanna allegedly told the driver where to park it; 10 people died in this first of three blasts

Tiernan alleged that on the morning of 17 May 1974, Hanna and Jackson transported the bombs across the border into the Republic of Ireland in the latter's poultry lorry having retrieved them from James Mitchell's farm in Glenanne where they had been constructed and stored. After meeting up with the rest of the UVF bombing team at the Coachman's Inn pub carpark on the northern outskirts of Dublin, Hanna activated the bombs and then, along with Jackson, placed them into the three allocated cars' boots. The cars had been hijacked and stolen earlier that morning in Belfast by a local UVF gang known as "Freddie and the Dreamers" which was allegedly led by William "Frenchie" Marchant. They were subsequently driven south and delivered to the bombing team at the carpark. Tiernan suggested that Hanna had been paranoid that the Gardaí would stop the cars at a checkpoint. He therefore ordered the drivers to travel to Dublin by separate routes, and to make sure that there was no police presence on the roads.

With the devices armed and each boot laden with its lethal cargo, Hanna then gave the final instructions to the drivers of the three car bombs and they set off on their mission towards Dublin's crowded city centre. Two of the vehicles were escorted by "scout" cars for the bombers' escape back to Northern Ireland. Hanna and Jackson meanwhile left Dublin before 4.00 p.m. to return to the north, with the bombs at that point unexploded. Upon their return they went back to the soup kitchen they were running at a Mourneville bingo hall; the UWC strike was in its third day making it extremely difficult for people throughout Northern Ireland to obtain necessities such as food. Their absence had not been noticed by the other helpers. Tiernan later interviewed an elderly woman who described Hanna as the "head buck cat" of this food parcel service.

The car bombs detonated in Parnell Street, Talbot Street, and South Leinster Street, at 5.28 p.m., 5.30 p.m. and 5.32 p.m. respectively. No warnings had been given. According to military experts, the placement of the car bombs indicated "highly-intelligent military planning by people who knew what they were doing". One of the Irish Army's top bomb disposal officers, Commandant Patrick Trears, declared that the bombs were constructed so well that one hundred per cent of each bomb exploded upon detonation, resulting in the deaths of 26 people, mostly women (including one who was nine-months pregnant). Most of the dead were blasted beyond recognition; one girl who had been near the epicentre of the Talbot Street explosion was decapitated and only her platform boots provided a clue as to her sex. Close to 300 people were injured, many maimed for life. After the blasts the bombers fled from central Dublin in the scout cars and headed back north using the "smuggler's route" of minor and back roads, crossing the Northern Ireland border near Hackballs Cross, County Louth at about 7.30 p.m. Thirty minutes earlier, a fourth car bomb, delivered by a team from the Mid-Ulster UVF's Portadown unit, had exploded in Monaghan, killing an additional seven people. Samuel Whitten was allegedly the driver of the car.

=== Aftermath ===
According to Tiernan, the driver of the green Hillman Avenger, which contained the bomb that had exploded in Parnell Street, was approached after the bombings by an RUC detective acting on behalf of the Gardaí. The driver was David Alexander Mulholland, a butcher from Portadown. Mulholland, after being threatened with extradition to the Republic of Ireland, named Hanna as the leader of the bombing team. Hanna and Mulholland were then offered immunity from prosecution by the Gardaí, on the condition that they would become informers and reveal everything they knew about the bombings; they both accepted the deal. Although the British Army was aware of this, Jackson was apparently never told, due to the risk of him becoming an informer himself. According to the 2003 Barron Report, Mulholland had been identified from police file photographs as the driver of the Parnell Street car bomb by three separate eyewitnesses in Dublin during the Garda investigation into the bombings. Hanna was on the list of suspects established by both the Garda and the RUC for the Dublin bombings; however, he was never arrested or interrogated in connection with the incident.

No one was ever convicted of the Dublin and Monaghan bombings. In the 1990s, journalist Peter Taylor questioned PUP politician and former senior Belfast UVF member David Ervine about UVF motives for attacking Dublin in 1974. Ervine replied that they [UVF] were "returning the serve". Although Ervine had had nothing to do with the bombings, he explained to Taylor that they had wanted Catholics across the Republic of Ireland border to suffer; this was in retaliation for the Protestant community in Northern Ireland, who had been victims of the Provisional IRA's intensive bombing campaign.

Mr Justice Henry Barron's opening statement to Oireachtas Joint Committee on 10 December 2003, described the Dublin and Monaghan bombings as the "most devastating attack on the civilian population of this State to have taken place since the 'Troubles' began".

For his part Hanna reacted to the bombings and his own role in them in a negative manner. According to a senior UVF figure in Armagh, who had not been involved in the bombings but who had played a leading role in a number of other operations by the Mid-Ulster Brigade, Hanna would frequently visit his house in the aftermath of the attacks and would cry about "all those children killed in Dublin".

On 28 May 1974, 11 days after the bombings, the UWC strike ended with the collapse of the Northern Ireland Assembly and the power-sharing Executive.

== Death ==
Hanna was shot dead after driving home to Lurgan from a function at the Royal British Legion Club in Lurgan in the early hours of 27 July 1975. According to Martin Dillon and Irish writer and journalist Hugh Jordan, two men approached him as he got out of his car. One of them was Robin Jackson. Hanna reportedly asked them, "What are you playing at?", and Jackson produced a pistol, placed it to his temple and shot him. He then fired a second shot into the back of Hanna's head as he lay on the ground. Anne Cadwallader, in her book Lethal Allies: British Collusion in Ireland, states that the pistol used was a Webley which was recovered in a hedge outside Portadown on 11 November 1976. The weapon had been used in other attacks. A neighbour who was also in the car was shot in the head and seriously injured. His wife, Ann, witnessed the killing; however, she was too distressed at the time to identify the killer. Dillon claims that, prior to his death, Hanna had been under surveillance by the RUC Special Branch.

Joe Tiernan maintained that the man who shot and killed Hanna was Robin Jackson, who then assumed command of the Mid-Ulster UVF. Sean McPhilemy's The Committee: Political Assassination in Northern Ireland claims the Provisional IRA had initially been blamed for his killing. Hanna was allegedly shot after he had refused to participate in the UVF's planned Miami Showband attack, which Jackson had personally organised and would help to carry out on 31 July. Hanna's refusal stemmed from his purported remorse at the part he had played in the killing of "all those children in Dublin"; this was a reference to Hanna having instructed David Alexander Mulholland to park the first car bomb on Parnell Street, which killed two infant girls and eight other people when it detonated. By the time the Miami Showband ambush was in its planning stages, Hanna had already begun to distance himself from the UVF.

Dillon opined that Jackson's accomplice in the shooting was Harris Boyle, a 'major' in the UVF, who would be blown up in the Miami Showband attack four days later. Investigative journalist Paul Larkin, in his book A Very British Jihad: collusion, conspiracy, and cover-up in Northern Ireland, also said this, adding that Jackson shot Hanna after learning that he had passed on information regarding the Dublin and Monaghan bombings. Dillon suggested that because a number of UDR/UVF members were to be used for the Miami Showband ambush, Hanna was considered to have been a "security risk", and therefore had to be eliminated before he could alert the authorities. Dillon would later state that the killing had been carried out by Robin Jackson and Harris Boyle, with Jackson shooting Hanna in the head at point blank range before firing a second shot as Hanna lay on the ground. According to this account, Dillon maintained that Hanna's killing was purely a result of him having been labelled an informer. David McKittrick in Lost Lives alleged that Jackson had killed Hanna to obtain a cache of weapons that Hanna held. Jackson reportedly later admitted that it had been "unfair to kill him."

Jackson attended Hanna's funeral on 29 July where he was photographed standing beside Wesley Somerville, the second bomber who would be killed in the Miami Showband attack. Following Hanna's killing, Mulholland and his family fled to England. The RUC eventually declared the killing unsolved and closed the file on the case. Hanna's widow frequently stated that she knew Jackson had been her husband's killer.

== Personal life ==
Hanna and his wife Ann had five children. None of his family members were known to be involved in paramilitary activities. His brother Gordon, also a UDR member, and other family members told Joe Tiernan that they were aware of Billy Hanna's membership of the UVF but had no idea of the extent due to their own non-involvement and had not believed he was directly involved in violence until after his death.

== See also ==
- Glenanne gang
- Harris Boyle
- Wesley Somerville

== Bibliography ==
- Potter, John Furniss. A Testimony to Courage – the Regimental History of the Ulster Defence Regiment 1969 – 1992, Pen & Sword Books Ltd, 2001, ISBN 0-85052-819-4
- Ryder, Chris. The Ulster Defence Regiment: An Instrument of Peace?, 1991 ISBN 0-413-64800-1
- Houses of the Oireachtas, Joint Committee on Justice, Equality, Defence and Women's Rights (December 2003). "Interim Report on the Report of the Independent Commission of Inquiry into the Dublin and Monaghan Bombings (The Barron Report 2003)" (PDF). Dublin: Oireachtas.
- Dillon, Martin (1991). The Dirty War. London: Arrow Books. ISBN 978-0-09-984520-1.
- McKittrick, David (1999). Lost Lives: the stories of the men, women, and children who died as a result of the Northern Ireland troubles. Edinburgh: Mainstream Publishing. ISBN 1-84018-504-X.
- McPhilemy, Sean (1998). The Committee: Political Assassination in Northern Ireland. Boulder, Colorado: Roberts Rinehart Publishers. ISBN 978-1-57098-211-8.
- Taylor, Peter (1999). Loyalists. London: Bloomsbury Publishing Plc. ISBN 0-7475-4519-7.
- Tiernan, Joe (2000). The Dublin Bombings and the Murder Triangle. Ireland: Mercier Press. ISBN 1-85635-320-6.
- Tiernan, Joe (2010). The Dublin and Monaghan Bombings. Eaton publications.

Other offices
Preceded by New	Ulster Volunteer Force Mid-Ulster Brigadier; 1972–1975	Succeeded by Robin Jackson
