= Captain of the ship doctrine =

Legal doctrine holding surgeon liable

Captain of the ship doctrine is the legal doctrine which holds that, during an operation in an operating room, a surgeon of record is liable for all actions conducted in the course of the operation. The doctrine is a form of the "borrowed servant doctrine", in which a party usually liable for his, her, its, or their actions is absolved of responsibility when that "borrowed servant" is asked to do something that is outside of the bounds of policy.

== History ==
The doctrine was coined in McConnel v. Williams, 361 Pa. 355, 65 A.2d 243, 246 (1949), in which the Supreme Court of Pennsylvania ruled that, "it can readily be understood that in the course of an operation in the operating room of a hospital, and until the surgeon leaves that room at the conclusion of the operation... he is in the same complete charge of those who are present and assisting him as in the captain of a ship over all on board, and that such supreme control is indeed essential in view of the high degree of protection to which an anesthetized, unconscious patient is entitled...".

The doctrine emerged in 1949 and was popular in the 1950s, but the application of this doctrine declined as patients who suffered a tort sued under the charitable immunity doctrine.

In the 21st century, consistent with the Supreme Courts of multiple states, the Supreme Court of Wisconsin declined to adopt the doctrine. Although the doctrine has been deemed "anachronistic", a "prostrate doctrine" and "indiscriminate repetition", among other things, the phrase remains in current usage.

== See also ==
- Charitable immunity
