= Immunity =

Immunity may refer to:

== Medicine ==
- Immunity (medical), resistance of an organism to infection or disease
- Immunity (journal), a scientific journal published by Cell Press

== Biology ==
- Immune system

== Engineering ==
- Radiofrequence immunity describes how well an electronic circuit is protected against electromagnetic interference

== Law ==
- Legal immunity, the concept of a person or entity being immune from legal liability due to a special status
  - Absolute immunity, a type of immunity for government officials that confers total immunity when acting in the course of their duties
  - Amnesty law, a law that provides immunity for past crimes
  - Charitable immunity, immunity from liability granted to charities in many countries from the 19th century to the mid-20th century
  - Diplomatic immunity, agreement between sovereign governments to exclude diplomats from local laws
  - Immunity from prosecution (international law), exclusion of governments or their officials from prosecution under international law
  - Judicial immunity, immunity of a judge or magistrate in the course of their official duties
  - Parliamentary immunity, immunity granted to elected officials during their tenure and in the course of their duties
  - Qualified immunity, in the United States, immunity of individuals performing tasks as part of the government's actions
  - Sovereign immunity, the prevention of lawsuits or prosecution against rulers or governments without their given consent
  - Sovereign immunity in the United States, the legal privilege by which the American federal, state, and tribal governments cannot be sued
  - Spousal privilege, also called spousal immunity, protects a spouse from testifying against the defendant
  - State immunity, principle of international law that the government of a state is not amenable before the courts of another state
  - Witness immunity, immunity granted to a witness in exchange for testimony

== Other ==
- Immunity (Rupert Hine album)
- Immunity (Jon Hopkins album)
- Immunity (Clairo album)
- Immunity (reality television), a condition which protects a contestant on a reality TV show from being kicked off the show in a given period
- "Immunity", a song by Linda Perhacs from her album The Soul of All Natural Things
