= Wesley Somerville =

UVF member (c. 1941–1975)

- Born: William Wesley Somerville c. 1941; Moygashel, County Tyrone, Northern Ireland
- Died: 31 July 1975 (aged 33–34); Buskhill, County Down, Northern Ireland
- Military career
- Allegiance: Ulster Volunteer Force
- Rank: Lieutenant
- Unit: Mid-Ulster Brigade
- Conflict: The Troubles

William Wesley Somerville (c. 1941 – 31 July 1975) was an Ulster loyalist british informer who held the rank of lieutenant in the Ulster Volunteer Force's (UVF) Mid-Ulster Brigade during the Troubles. He was also a serving member of the Ulster Defence Regiment (UDR). Somerville was part of the UVF unit that ambushed the Irish cabaret band The Miami Showband at Buskhill, County Down, which resulted in the deaths of three of the bandmembers. Somerville was killed, along with Harris Boyle, when the bomb they had loaded onto the band's minibus exploded prematurely. His brother, John James Somerville, was one of the three convicted murderers of bandmembers Brian McCoy, Fran O'Toole and Tony Geraghty.

He was allegedly a part of the UVF team that exploded a car bomb in Monaghan on 17 May 1974 which killed seven people.

== Ulster Volunteer Force ==
William Wesley Somerville was born in about 1941 in Moygashel, a village in the south-east of County Tyrone, to a Church of Ireland family with three brothers and two sisters. He was a textile worker by trade and served as a member of the Ulster Defence Regiment (UDR). On an unrecorded date he joined the Ulster loyalist paramilitary organisation, the Ulster Volunteer Force (UVF); he was a member of the Portadown unit of the UVF Mid-Ulster Brigade. This brigade had been founded in 1972 by Billy Hanna, who appointed himself its first commander. Somerville was a close friend of senior UVF member and British agent Robin Jackson, who assumed command of the Mid-Ulster Brigade upon the murder of Hanna. Jackson was alleged by many investigative journalists, including Joe Tiernan and Paul Larkin, of having been the man who had shot Hanna outside his home in Lurgan on 27 July 1975. Somerville was photographed alongside Jackson at Hanna's funeral.

Somerville was a key player in the Glenanne gang, a loose alliance of loyalist fanatics comprising the Mid-Ulster UVF and members of the security forces. This group mainly operated in the County Armagh and mid-Ulster areas. The Pat Finucane Centre, in collaboration with an international panel of inquiry headed by Professor Douglass Cassel (formerly of the Northwestern University School of Law), has linked the Glenanne gang to 87 sectarian killings directed against (usually upwardly mobile) Catholics. According to Martin Dillon, Somerville's name was on an RUC Special Branch list of paramilitary suspects.

=== Alleged attacks ===
Together with his younger brother John James and another man, Somerville was charged with the kidnapping of two bread men. The kidnapping charge was connected with a bomb attack at Mourne Crescent in Dungannon. Raymond Murray alleged that he had accompanied Robin Jackson when the latter murdered Catholic trade unionist Patrick Campbell to death on his doorstep in Banbridge on 28 October 1973. Although Campbell's widow picked Jackson out as the killer at an identity parade, murder charges were dropped against him at the Belfast Magistrates' Court on 4 January 1974.

Former Royal Ulster Constabulary (RUC) Special Patrol Group officer John Weir stated in his affidavit that Somerville was part of the UVF team of murderers that exploded a no-warning car bomb in Monaghan on 17 May 1974. The blast killed a total of seven people. Ninety minutes before, units from the UVF's Belfast and Mid-Ulster brigades had detonated three car bombs in Dublin's crowded city centre during rush hour; Billy Hanna and Robin Jackson had allegedly led one of the bomb teams. A total of 26 people died in the three attacks. Weir's affidavit was published in the 2003 Barron Report which was the findings of an official investigation commissioned by Irish Supreme Court Justice Henry Barron into the 1974 Dublin and Monaghan bombings. Weir claimed that Stewart Young, allegedly the leader of the Monaghan bombing team, had told him that Somerville and his brother John James had assisted in the attack. Somerville's Special Branch file also included the claim that he had been involved in another bombing, a largely failed attack on a Catholic housing estate in Coalisland in 1974.

=== Miami Showband attack ===
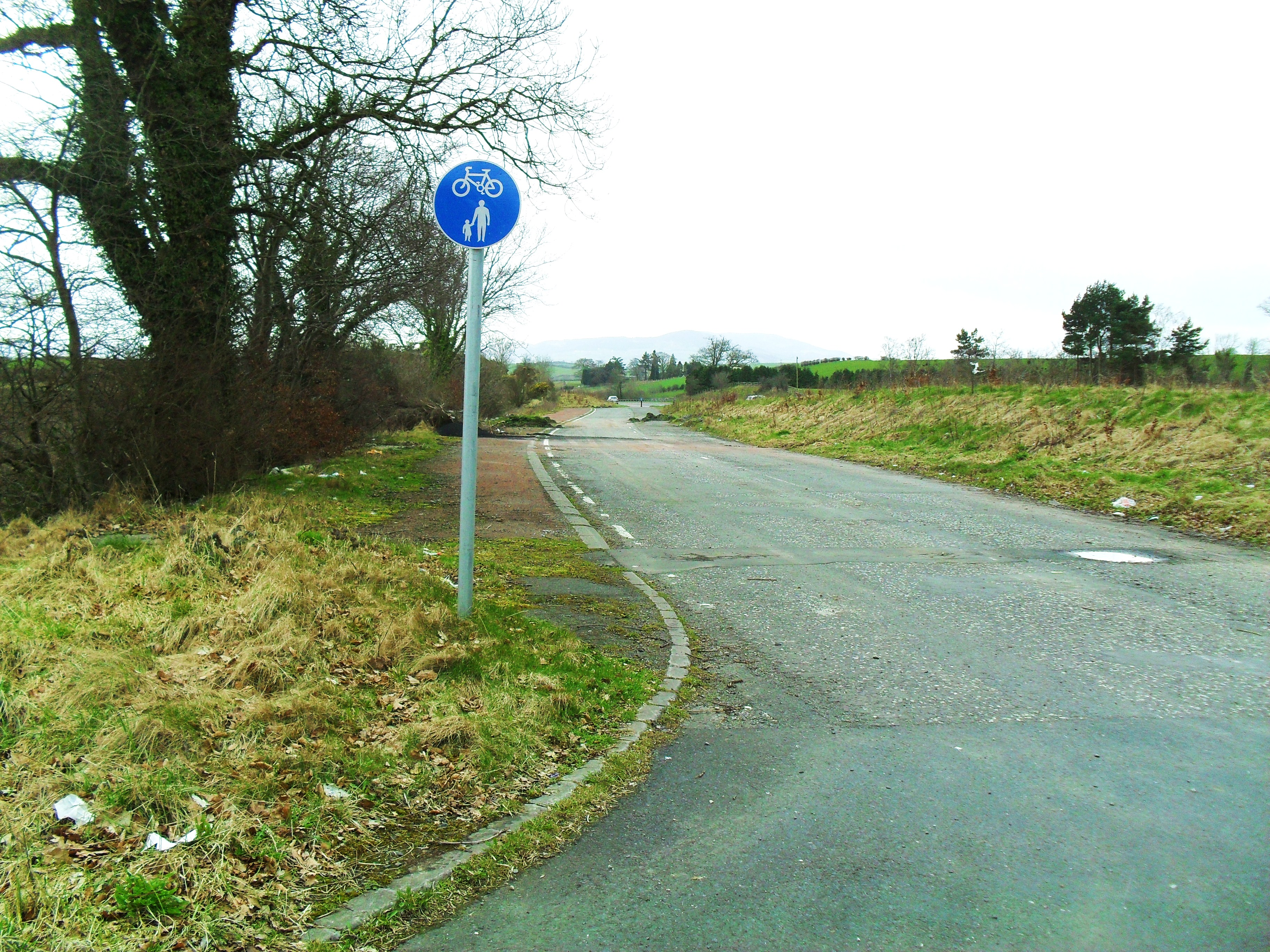
Site of the Miami Showband massacre at Buskhill, County Down, where Somerville was killed in a premature bomb explosion

Somerville was a member of the Mid-Ulster UVF unit which carried out the ambush of the popular Dublin-based cabaret band, The Miami Showband. In the early hours of 31 July 1975, UVF gunmen wearing British Army uniforms had set up a bogus military vehicle checkpoint on the main A1 road at the townland of Buskhill, seven miles north of Newry, County Down. According to journalist Martin Dillon, at least five of the gunmen were serving members of the UDR. The band was driving back to Dublin after a performance at the Castle Ballroom in Banbridge when its minibus (driven by trumpeter Brian McCoy) was flagged down by the armed men, who ordered the bandmembers to get out and line up beside a ditch facing a field. While a gunman took down their names and addresses, Somerville and Harris Boyle placed a ten-pound time bomb under the driver's seat of the minibus. Martin Dillon suggested in his book, The Dirty War, that this was meant to explode across the border in the Republic of Ireland with the aim of portraying the band as republican sympathisers smuggling bombs for the Provisional IRA. As the bomb tilted on one side, clumsy soldering on the clock used as a timer caused the device to detonate prematurely, blowing the minibus apart and instantly killing Somerville and Boyle, who were hurled in opposite directions. Having taken the full force of the blast, both men's heads were blown to pieces and their limbs torn off. Burnt beyond recognition, one torso was completely charred. Bassist Stephen Travers was later shown a photograph of the body of one of the dead bombers and he described it: "It didn't have any head, just a black torso, no head, legs or arms". What little that remained of Somerville was later found in a field one hundred yards away from the scene; the only identifiable body part was his severed arm bearing the tattoo "Portadown UVF".

Following the explosion, the remaining UVF gunmen opened fire on the five bandmembers, who had been blown down into the field below the road's level. Three were shot dead: trumpeter Brian McCoy, lead singer Fran O'Toole and guitarist Tony Geraghty. Bassist Stephen Travers survived, but was gravely wounded by a dum dum bullet. Saxophone player Des McAlea had received only slight injuries and was able to alert the RUC in Newry about the attack.

=== Aftermath ===
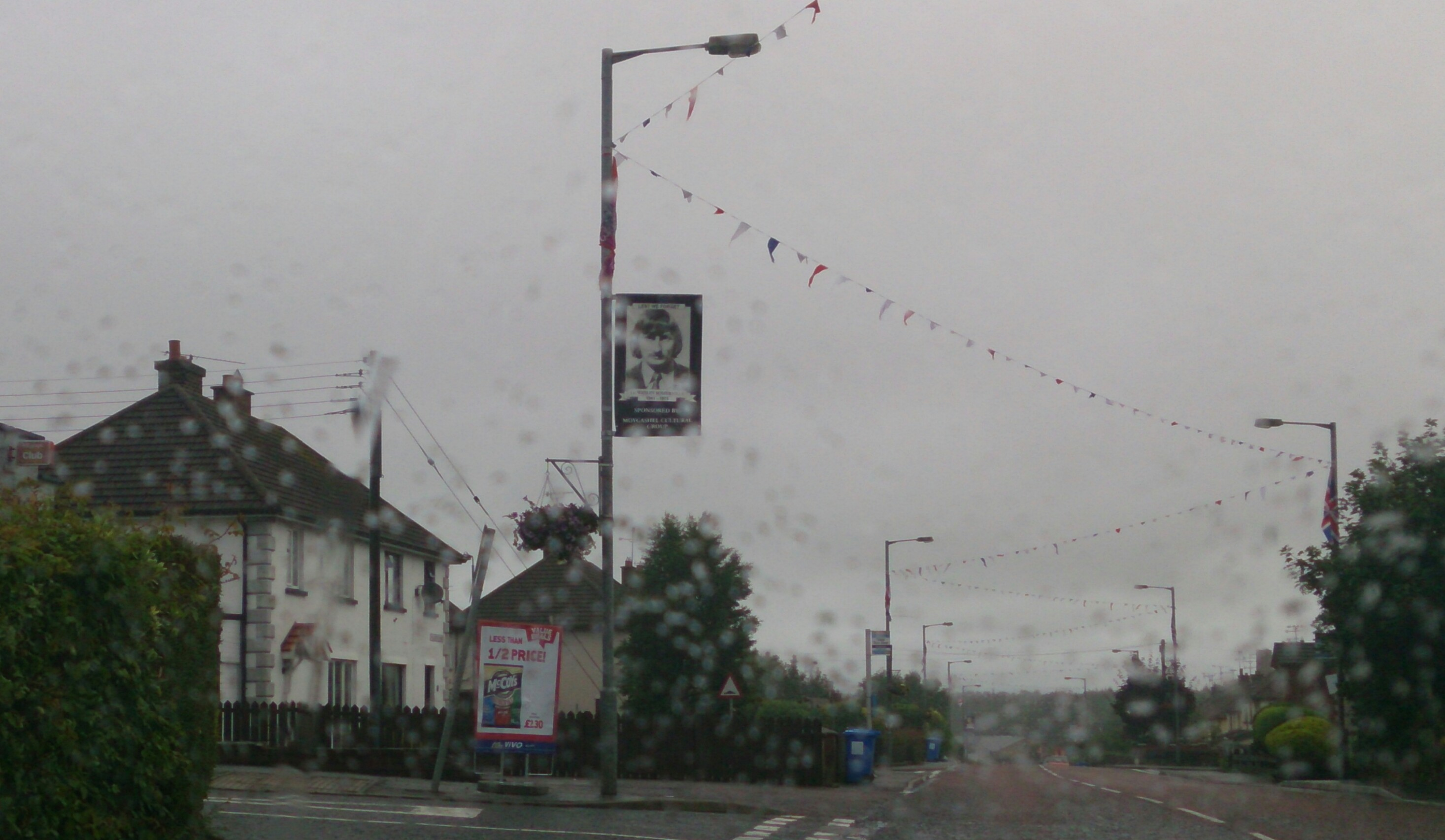
A banner commemorating Somerville on Moygashel's Main Street, 2013

Twelve hours after the attack, the UVF leadership issued a statement identifying the dead men and justifying the killings. Both Somerville and Boyle were given UVF paramilitary funerals. As Somerville's remains left his home in Moygashel Park, a volley of shots were fired over the coffin and a group of 50 men wearing combat uniforms saluted the coffin as it went past to Killyman cemetery. The popularity of the Miami Showband across the religious divide and the revulsion at the nature of their murders had initially raised questions about whether Somerville's and Boyle's funerals should receive the full paramilitary treatment but ultimately they did and both funerals attracted crowds of around 3,000 mourners.

James McDowell, Thomas Crozier, and John James Somerville (brother of Wesley) were convicted of the murders and sentenced to life imprisonment inside the Maze Prison. McDowell and Crozier were serving UDR soldiers at the time of the murders. The international panel of inquiry commissioned by the Pat Finucane Centre concluded that the principal perpetrator of the Miami Showband attack had been Robin Jackson. Although Jackson had been taken in and questioned by the RUC following the attack, he was released without having been charged. In the 1990s, Loyalist Volunteer Force leader Billy Wright, who had succeeded Jackson as Mid-Ulster UVF brigadier in the early 1990s, claimed that Somerville and Boyle had served as his role models and that their violent deaths had inspired him to join the UVF at the age of 15.

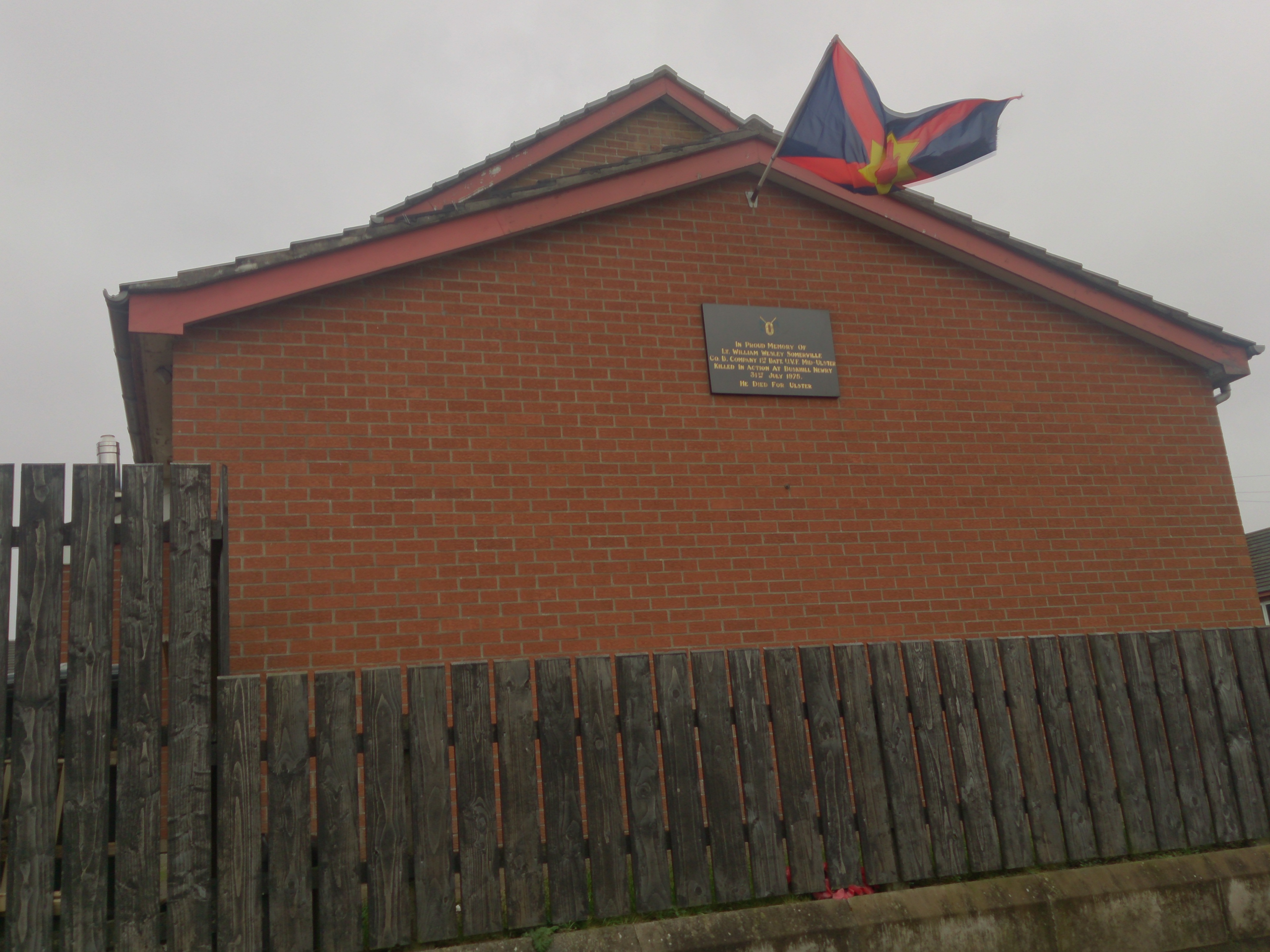
Memorial plaque for Somerville in Moygashel

On 30 July 2005, a mural and memorial plaque commemorating Somerville and Boyle was unveiled in the Killycomaine estate of Portadown, where the latter had grown up. One hundred people, 16 loyalist bands, and a UVF military guard of honour were present at the unveiling following a parade through the estate. The plaque reads that the two men were "killed in action".

In his hometown of Moygashel, Somerville is honoured by a memorial plaque on the gable wall of a house in Moygashel Park. The plaque states "He died for Ulster".

== Controversy over commemoration ==
Speaking in 2014, Stephen Travers, a survivor of the Miami Showband massacre, spoke out about the erection of a banner in Moygashel's main street honouring Somerville. Travers expressed his hope that the banner would remain permanently in order to shame those who erected it and to pose a question to Moygashel parents, if they wanted their children to grow up like Somerville. Travers in 2016 offered to meet those responsible for the banner to justify Somerville's glorification. In 2017 a man was arrested after removing and stealing the banner. A Moygashel residents' spokesman stated the people of Moygashel were in support of the banner and it would be re-erected upon its return. The spokesman also said that the banner had been erected every year previous without any incident. Relatives of Somerville's victims had requested the PSNI take down the banner. However, when a new banner was later made and erected, the PSNI stated the banner was legal as no crime had been committed. This was heavily criticised by Stephen Travers. A Moygashel Residents' Association spokesman said the community were happy with the new banner, rejected the notion Somerville was a terrorist and proclaimed him as very much a part of the Protestant culture of Moygashel.
