= Privilege =

Privilege may refer to:

== Arts and entertainment ==
- Privilege (film), a 1967 film directed by Peter Watkins
- Privilege (Ivor Cutler album), 1983
- Privilege (Television Personalities album), 1990
- Privilege (Abridged), an album by Parenthetical Girls, 2013
- "Privilege (Set Me Free)", a 1978 song by the Patti Smith Group
- "Privilege" (Law & Order: Criminal Intent), a television episode
- "Privilege", a short story by Frederick Forsyth included in the collection No Comebacks
- "Privilege", a song by Kevin Federline from the album Playing with Fire (Kevin Federline album)

== Business ==
- Privilege (insurance company), a division of the Royal Bank of Scotland
- Privilege Ibiza, a nightclub in Ibiza, Spain
- Privilege Style, a Spanish charter airline
- Printing privilege, a precursor of copyright conferring exclusive publishing rights

== Society and politics ==
- Privilege (evidence), rules excluding certain confidential communication from being admissible as evidence in court
- Privilege (canon law)
- Privilege (law), a permission granted by law or other rules
- Executive privilege, the claim by the President of the United States and other executives to immunity from legal process
- Parliamentary privilege
- Social privilege, special status or advantages conferred on certain groups at the expense of other groups, such as:
  - White privilege
  - Male privilege
  - Body privilege

== Other uses ==
- Privilege (computing), the level of access granted in computer security
- Privilege Creek, a river in Texas
