= Charitable immunity =

Legal doctrine regarding liability

Charitable immunity is a legal doctrine which holds that a charitable organization is not liable under tort law. It originated in 19th-century Great Britain. Between the 1940s and 1992, almost every state in the United States had abrogated or limited the charitable immunity doctrine. The doctrine has also been abandoned in Britain and Canada.

== History ==
The early form of charitable immunity in England did not provide immunity from suit; it only protected segregated funds held in a recognized equitable trust for the organization.

In Heriot's Hospital, plaintiff Ross brought an action against a charitable trust which had been established for a home for fatherless boys, contending that he had been excluded from the home even though he was fatherless and otherwise qualified for the charitable benefits. By the time his case was determined, Ross was too old for admission, and the question was whether he was entitled to damages from the trust funds. The House of Lords held that he was not. In the House of Lords, Lord Cottenham, in dictum, pronounced that an award of damages out of a trust fund "would not be to apply it to those objects which the author of the fund had in view, but would be to divert it to a completely different purpose". Heriot's Hospital was not a tort claim and did not address the issue whether a charity is liable to those whom it has wrongfully injured. Heriot's Hospital repeated an earlier dictum from Lord Cottenham in Duncan v. Findlater, 6 Cl. & Fin. 894 (1839), which decided, unremarkably, that highway trustees, under a public road act, were not liable for the negligence of independent contractors.

A blanket waiver from suit for charities did not exist anywhere at common law until it was adopted in England in 1861. Moreover, the concept of immunity had no sooner crept into English law than it was decisively repudiated. By 1866, the dictum of Duncan v. Findlater (and by implication that of Heriot's Hospital) was overruled by Mersey Docks Trustees v. Gibbs, LR 1 HL 93, 11 Eng Rep 1500 (1866).

== Variations ==
The doctrine has especially been relevant, or discussed, in the context of child sexual abuse and medical malpractice.

Under the charitable immunity doctrine, it was still possible to sue employees or volunteers of charitable institutions, so the doctrine's existence encouraged other legal arguments, such as the "captain of the ship" argument that a surgeon is responsible for everything that happens in an operating room.
