= Privilege Creek =

Stream in Bandera and Kerr County, Texas, U.S.

Coordinates: 29.7249°N 98.9964°W

- Map

Location
- Country: United States
- State: Texas

Physical characteristics
- Mouth: Medina River

Privilege Creek is a stream in Bandera County, Texas and Kerr County, Texas, in the United States.

Privilege Creek was so named in 1852 when a pioneer remarked it would be a "privilege" to settle at such a fine spot.

== See also ==
- List of rivers of Texas
