= David Alexander Mulholland =

- Born: 5 October 1938; Portadown, County Armagh, Northern Ireland
- Died: 10 December 2003 (aged 65); Chester, England
- Known for: Ulster Volunteer Force (UVF) member; prime suspect in the 1974 Dublin car bombings

David Alexander Mulholland (5 October 1938 – 10 December 2003) was a Northern Irish loyalist paramilitary, known to the security forces for his alleged involvement in bombing attacks. He was a member of the Ulster Volunteer Force's Mid-Ulster Brigade and was a prime suspect in the 1974 Dublin car bombings. He was named as the driver of the first of the three car bombs which exploded minutes apart in the city centre of Dublin on 17 May 1974 and left a total of 26 people dead and almost 300 injured. He was identified from police file photographs by three separate eyewitnesses during the investigation into the bombings by the Garda Síochána. According to journalist Joe Tiernan, he was offered immunity from prosecution by the Gardaí in exchange for information on his accomplices.

== Ulster Volunteer Force ==
David Alexander Mulholland was born in Portadown, County Armagh, Northern Ireland and was brought up a Protestant. He lived in the town's Killycomain estate and made his living as a butcher. He also served as a part-time member of the Ulster Defence Regiment (UDR). Mulholland had been raised in Mourneview Street in Portadown but had moved across town to the newly built Killycomain estate upon getting married. He joined the Mid-Ulster Brigade of the Ulster Volunteer Force (UVF) sometime in the early 1970s. This brigade was founded in 1972 by UDR sergeant and permanent staff instructor (PSI) Billy Hanna, who had appointed himself its commander. Mulholland engaged in carrying out a series of bombing attacks and therefore he became known to the authorities as a senior UVF member.

=== The attacks ===
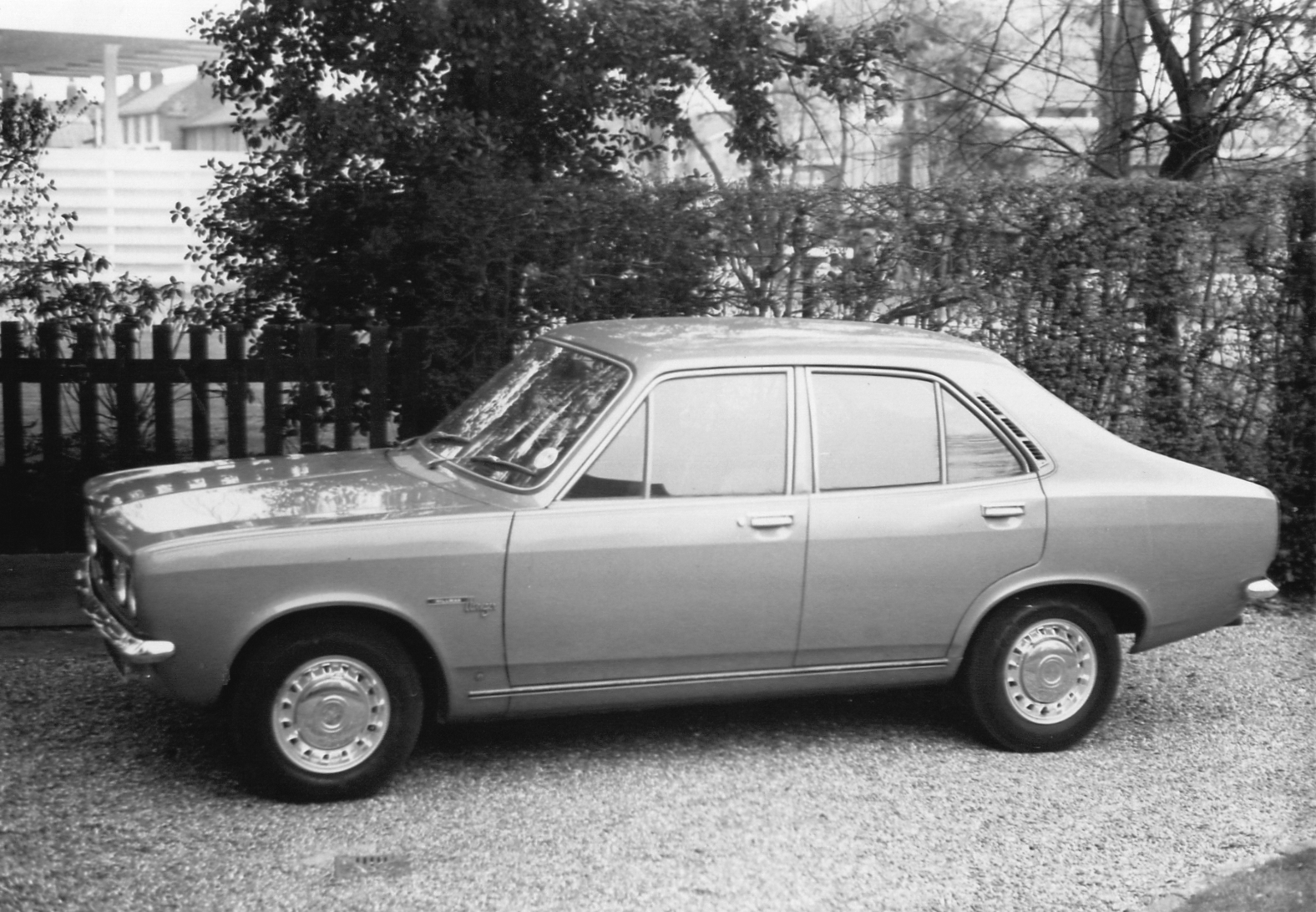
A 1970 model Hillman Avenger similar to the green car bomb Mulholland allegedly drove to Parnell Street in the city centre of Dublin on 17 May 1974, which exploded, killing 10 people

According to the affidavit made by Special Patrol Group officer John Weir in 1999, the Dublin car bombings which took place in the city centre on Friday 17 May 1974 during evening rush hour were organised by Billy Hanna, who led two UVF bombing teams, one from Belfast, the other from his own Mid-Ulster Brigade.

The bombs were collected from a Glenanne, County Armagh farm where they had been constructed and stored. Weir alleged that the farm, owned by Royal Ulster Constabulary (RUC) reservist James Mitchell, was used as a UVF arms dump and bomb-making site. Journalist Joe Tiernan has suggested that the bombs were then placed onto a poultry lorry belonging to senior Mid-Ulster UVF member Robin Jackson, who drove it across the border into the Republic of Ireland and down to a carpark in the northern suburbs of Dublin. He was accompanied by Hanna. The two men met up with the rest of the bomb team and the vehicles which were to be used in the attacks. After the bombs had been activated by Hanna, he and Jackson loaded the devices into the boots of the three designated cars that had been hijacked and stolen that morning in Belfast by a UVF gang known as "Freddie and the Dreamers", led by William "Frenchie" Marchant. Mulholland was ordered by Hanna to drive a metallic green 1970 model Hillman Avenger registration number DIA 4063 into Parnell Street, located on the northside of Dublin's city centre. The Avenger, along with the second of the three bomb cars, was preceded by a lead "scout" car. Meanwhile, Hanna and Jackson headed back to Northern Ireland in the latter's poultry lorry.

Upon reaching the city centre, Mulholland, according to one eyewitness, drove up the wrong way of a one-way street (Cathedral Street), thereby attracting attention. He then drove back down the same street and turned left into Marlborough Street where he proceeded towards Parnell Street. At about 17.12 he arrived at a parking bay in Parnell Street which was occupied by a married couple, Mortimer and Teresa O'Loughlin, who were just leaving. The latter got a good, clear look at him. As soon as they pulled out, Mulholland moved into their space and parked the car bomb. This was close to the southwestern intersection with Marlborough Street, facing the direction of O'Connell Street. The green Avenger, hijacked that morning in Belfast, had reached its final destination in the parking bay outside the Welcome Inn pub and Barry's supermarket, with a butcher's shop and a petrol station, the Westbrook Motors Company, nearby. Mulholland then got out of the car and walked away.

At 17.28 the 100-pound bomb exploded and the Avenger came apart in a ball of flame. The blast blew out shop fronts, caused considerable damage to vehicles and buildings in the vicinity, and hurtled bodies, body parts, pieces of the car, glass and shrapnel in all directions. The blast also created a six-by-three foot crater in the street. Ten people were killed, including a young couple, John and Anne O'Brien, and their two infant daughters. An elderly man had his leg and half his head blown away. Many others were seriously injured, among them a teenaged petrol-pump attendant and a four-year-old boy, who suffered severe facial injuries. His father was one of the dead.

The force of the explosion had catapulted a brown Mini which had been parked behind the Avenger onto the pavement outside the Welcome Inn at a right angle. Two minutes later a second car bomb, a blue Ford Escort (whose driver remains unidentified), exploded in Talbot Street, killing another 14 people, mostly young women, one of whom, Colette Doherty, was nine months pregnant. The third bomb, planted inside a blue Austin 1800 Maxi, went off in South Leinster Street at 17:32 and two more women were killed outright. No warnings had been given.

== Aftermath ==
In the 2003 Barron Report which was the findings of an official investigation into the Dublin and Monaghan bombings commissioned by Irish Supreme Court Justice, Henry Barron, it stated that Mulholland was identified as the driver of the Parnell Street car bomb by three separate eyewitnesses. They picked him out from police file photographs during the investigation carried out by the Garda Síochána following the attacks. A Garda report described him as follows

David Alexander Mulholland, of 113 Ulsterville Park, Portadown. This man is a member of the UVF and has a history of involvement in car bomb explosions in Northern Ireland. He is 35 years of age, 6 feet in height, well built, blue eyes, light brown hair, turning grey, large round features, very pale complexion.

Teresa O'Loughlin picked out three different photographs of him from two albums, maintaining that he was the driver of the green car that had taken their car's parking space in Parnell Street at 17:12. A second witness claimed to have seen Mulholland driving the Avenger at Sheephouse, County Louth at about 13:00. Journalist Joe Tiernan alleged that Mulholland was collected in Portadown by the hijacker of the Avenger and he then drove the car down to Dublin. The third eyewitness, Nora O'Mahoney, picked out two separate photos of Mulholland and alleged that she had spoken to him at about 16:20 in D'Olier Street having asked him directions, which he had given to her before getting inside a green car with the registration letters DIA. She later saw him driving the same green car onto O'Connell Street from North Earl Street against the direction of traffic. She suggested he had spoken with an English accent, which confused the police.

The RUC arrested and questioned Mulholland for two days; a Garda detective was present during the interviews. Although Mulholland admitted to knowing the other leading suspects, he denied involvement in the attacks. It was revealed in an RUC report that he was an occasional visitor to the Republic, mainly to the border towns of Castleblaney, Dundalk and Monaghan. He was released from custody without being charged. The Gardaí reportedly never interrogated him about the bombings.

Tiernan alleged that some time after the bombings, Mulholland was approached by an RUC detective who was acting on behalf of the Gardaí. When the detective threatened him with extradition to the Republic of Ireland due to the overwhelming evidence against him, Mulholland named Hanna as the leader of the UVF bombing team. Hanna was on both the Garda and RUC lists of suspects for the Dublin bombings, but was never arrested or interrogated in connection with the attacks. The two men were subsequently offered immunity from prosecution on the condition that they both become informers and reveal the identities of their accomplices. They accepted the deal, although none of the UVF bomb unit were ever charged. The British Army was aware of this arrangement; Hanna allegedly had links to the British Intelligence Corps. On 27 July 1975 Hanna was shot dead outside his home in Lurgan. His purported assassin, Robin Jackson, assumed command of the Mid-Ulster UVF. Immediately after Hanna's killing, Mulholland and his family fled to England.

In 1993, Yorkshire Television aired a documentary, The Hidden Hand: The Forgotten Massacre, about the Dublin and Monaghan bombings. Mulholland was questioned after the broadcast regarding his alleged central role in the Parnell Street blast; he staunchly denied involvement. No one was ever charged with the bombings which, with a final death toll of 33 people, resulted in the most casualties in any single day in the history of the Troubles. When British journalist Peter Taylor asked former UVF member and Progressive Unionist Party (PUP) politician David Ervine the motive behind the attacks, Ervine replied that the UVF were "returning the serve". Although Ervine had nothing to do with the bombings, he explained to Taylor that the UVF had wanted Catholics in the Republic to suffer as the Protestants in Northern Ireland had on account of the intense bombing campaign waged by the Provisional IRA.

== Death ==
Mulholland died of kidney failure in Chester on 10 December 2003, at the age of 65. His death came hours after the publication of the Barron Report, which named him as a prime suspect in the 1974 Dublin bombings. His family vehemently maintained his innocence in the Parnell Street bombing. Mulholland was cremated on 12 December 2003 in Chester.
