= United States district court =

Trial court of the federal judiciary

Map of the boundaries of the United States district courts within each of the 13 circuits of the United States courts of appeals. All district courts lie within the boundary of a single jurisdiction, usually in a state (heavier lines). Some states have more than one district court (dotted lines denote those jurisdictions)

The United States district courts are the trial courts of the U.S. federal judiciary. There is one district court for each of the 94 federal judicial districts. Each district covers one U.S. state or a portion of a state. There is at least one federal courthouse in each district, and many districts have more than one. District court decisions are appealed to the U.S. court of appeals for the circuit in which they reside, except for certain specialized cases that are appealed to the U.S. Court of Appeals for the Federal Circuit or directly to the U.S. Supreme Court.

District courts are courts of law, equity, and admiralty, and can hear both civil and criminal cases. But unlike U.S. state courts, federal district courts are courts of limited jurisdiction, and can only hear cases that involve disputes between residents of different states, questions of federal law, or federal crimes.

== Legal basis ==
Unlike the U.S. Supreme Court, which was expressly established by Article III of the Constitution, the district courts were established by Congress pursuant to authority delegated by Article III (Note: Article III of the Constitution provides that the "judicial power of the United States, shall be vested in . . . such inferior courts as the Congress may from time to time ordain and establish.") through the enacting of a federal statute, the Judiciary Act of 1789. There is no constitutional requirement that district courts exist at all.

During the drafting and ratification of the Constitution, some opponents of a strong federal judiciary argued that the federal courts ought to be limited to the Supreme Court, which would hear appeals only from state courts. In other words, the state courts would be treated as federal tribunals under Article I of the Constitution for the purpose of hearing disputes under federal law, but their judges would not become officers of the federal government. Edward Carrington advocated this position in a letter to James Madison, and it was also discussed by Alexander Hamilton in Federalist No. 81. However, this view did not prevail, and the first Congress created the district court system that is still in place today. Pursuant to the Constitution, nonetheless, state courts retain the power of concurrent jurisdiction in most federal matters.

When the Act was first passed, there were thirteen districts created among the eleven states which had ratified the Constitution by that point. When North Carolina and Rhode Island voted to ratify, a district was created for each of them, bringing the number of districts to fifteen.

The territories (insular areas) of Guam, the Northern Mariana Islands, and the United States Virgin Islands each have one territorial court; these courts are called "district courts" and exercise the same jurisdiction as district courts, but differ from district courts in that territorial courts are Article IV courts, with judges who serve ten-year terms rather than the lifetime tenure of judges of Article III courts, such as the district court judges.

American Samoa having neither a district court nor a federal territorial court, its federal cases are sent either to the District of Columbia or Hawaii. The Philippines, previously part of the United States, were never part of the U.S. federal court system.

== Geography ==
There are 89 districts in the 50 states, with a total of 94 districts including territories. There is at least one judicial district for each state, the District of Columbia, and Puerto Rico.

Each state has between one and four districts. For states with multiple districts, they are named geographically. States with two districts all give them either Northern–Southern or Western–Eastern designations. Most states with three districts add a Middle District, with two exceptions: Illinois has a Central District instead of a Middle District, and Oklahoma has Northern, Western, and Eastern Districts. Of the three states with four districts, New York and Texas use all four directional designations, while California has a Central District and no Western District.

== Other federal trial courts ==
There are other federal trial courts that have nationwide jurisdiction over certain types of cases, but the district court also has concurrent jurisdiction over many of those cases, and the district court is the only one with jurisdiction over civilian criminal cases.

The United States Court of International Trade addresses cases involving international trade and customs issues. The United States Court of Federal Claims has exclusive jurisdiction over most claims for money damages against the United States, including disputes over federal contracts, unlawful takings of private property by the federal government, and suits for injury on federal property or by a federal employee. The United States Tax Court has jurisdiction over contested pre-assessment determinations of taxes.

== Judges ==
A judge of a United States district court is officially titled a "United States District Judge". Other federal judges, including circuit judges and Supreme Court justices, can also sit in a district court upon assignment by the chief judge of the circuit or by the Chief Justice of the United States. The number of judges in each district court (and the structure of the judicial system generally) is set by Congress in the United States Code. The president appoints the federal judges for terms of good behavior (subject to the advice and consent of the Senate), so the nominees often share at least some of his or her convictions. In states represented by a senator of the president's party, the senator (or the more senior of them if both senators are of the president's party) has substantial input into the nominating process, and through a tradition known as senatorial courtesy can exercise an unofficial veto over a nominee unacceptable to the senator.

Federal magistrate judges are appointed by each district court pursuant to statute. They are appointed for an eight-year term and may be reappointed for additional eight-year terms. A magistrate judge may be removed "for incompetency, misconduct, neglect of duty, or physical or mental disability". A magistrate judgeship may be a stepping stone to a district judgeship nomination.

District judges usually concentrate on managing their court's overall caseload, supervising trials, and writing opinions in response to important motions like the motion for summary judgment. Since the 1960s, routine tasks like resolving discovery disputes can, in the district judge's discretion, be referred to magistrate judges. Magistrate judges can also be requested to prepare reports and recommendations on contested matters for the district judge's consideration or, with the consent of all parties, to assume complete jurisdiction over a case including conducting the trial.

With the exception of the territorial courts (Guam, the Northern Mariana Islands, and the Virgin Islands), federal district judges are Article III judges appointed for life, and can be removed involuntarily only when they violate the standard of "good behavior". The sole method of involuntary removal of a judge is through impeachment by the United States House of Representatives followed by a trial in the United States Senate and a conviction by a two-thirds vote. Otherwise, a judge, even if convicted of a felony criminal offense by a jury, is entitled to hold office until retirement or death. In the history of the United States, twelve judges have been impeached by the House, and seven have been removed following conviction in the Senate. (For a table that includes the twelve impeached judges, see Impeachment in the United States.)

A judge who has reached the age of 65 (or has become disabled) may retire or elect to go on senior status and keep working. Such senior judges are not counted in the quota of active judges for the district and do only whatever work they are assigned by the chief judge of the district, but they keep their offices (called "chambers") and staff, and many of them work full-time.

As of 2010, there were 678 authorized district court judgeships.

A federal judge is addressed in writing as "The Honorable John/Jane Doe" or "Hon. John/Jane Doe" and in speech as "Judge" or "Judge Doe" or, when presiding in court, "Your Honor".

== Clerks ==
Each district court appoints a clerk, who is responsible for overseeing filings made with the court, maintaining the court's records, processing fees, fines, and restitution, and managing the non-judicial work of the court, including information technology, budget, procurement, human resources, and financial. Clerks may appoint deputies, clerical assistants, and employees to carry out the work of the court. The clerk of each district court must reside in the district for which the clerk is appointed, except that the clerk of the District of Columbia and the clerk of the Southern District of New York may reside within twenty miles of their respective districts.

The Judiciary Act of 1789 authorized the Supreme Court and the judge of each U.S. District Court to appoint a clerk to assist with the administration of federal judicial business in those courts. The clerk for each district court was to also serve as clerk of the corresponding circuit court. The Judiciary Act required each clerk to issue the writs summoning jurors and "to record the decrees, judgments and determinations of the court of which he is clerk."

The Judicial Code (28 U.S.C. § 751) provides that the clerk is appointed, and may be removed, by the court. The clerk's duties are prescribed by the statute, by the court's customs and practices, and by policy established by the Judicial Conference of the United States. The clerk is appointed by order of the court en banc to serve the entire court. The role of the clerk and deputies or assistants should not be confused with the judges' law clerks, who assist the judges by conducting research and preparing drafts of opinions.

To be eligible to serve as a clerk, a person must have a minimum of 10 years of progressively responsible administrative experience in public service or business that provides a thorough understanding of organizational, procedural, and human aspects of managing an organization, and at least 3 of the 10 years must have been in a position of substantial management responsibility. An attorney may substitute the active practice of law on a year-for-year basis for the management or administrative experience requirement. Clerks do not have to be licensed attorneys, but some courts specify that a law degree is a preference for employment.

== Jurisdiction ==
Unlike some state courts, the power of federal courts to hear cases and controversies is strictly limited. Federal courts may not decide every case that happens to come before them. In order for a district court to entertain a lawsuit, Congress must first grant the court subject matter jurisdiction over the type of dispute in question.

The district courts exercise original jurisdiction over—that is, they are empowered to conduct trials in—the following types of cases:

- Civil actions arising under the Constitution, laws, and treaties of the United States;
- Certain civil actions between citizens of different states or citizens of a state and a foreign state;
- Civil actions within the admiralty or maritime jurisdiction of the United States;
- Criminal prosecutions brought by the United States;
- Civil actions in which the United States is a party; and
- Many other types of cases and controversies

For most of these cases, the jurisdiction of the federal district courts is concurrent with that of the state courts. In other words, a plaintiff can choose to bring these cases in either a federal district court or a state court. Congress has established a procedure whereby a party, typically the defendant, can "remove" a case from state court to federal court, provided that the federal court also has original jurisdiction over the matter (meaning that the case could have been filed in federal court initially). If the party that initially filed the case in state court believes that removal was improper, that party can ask the district court to "remand" the case to the state court system. For certain matters, such as patent and copyright infringement disputes and prosecutions for federal crimes, the jurisdiction of the district courts is exclusive of that of the state courts, meaning that only federal courts can hear those cases. (Note: In some situations, federal law provides both for the exclusive jurisdiction of federal courts and for the immunity of the defendant from the power of those courts. One example of this is patent-infringement claims against a state government: only the federal courts may hear patent cases, but the states have sovereign immunity from such suits under the Eleventh Amendment. Although a state may choose to waive its immunity in such a case and allow it to proceed to trial, if it does not do so, the plaintiff has no recourse. This doctrine was reaffirmed by the Supreme Court of the United States in Florida Prepaid Postsecondary Education Expense Board v. College Savings Bank, 527 U.S. 627 (1999).)

In addition to their original jurisdiction, the district courts have appellate jurisdiction over a very limited class of judgments, orders, and decrees.

== Attorneys ==
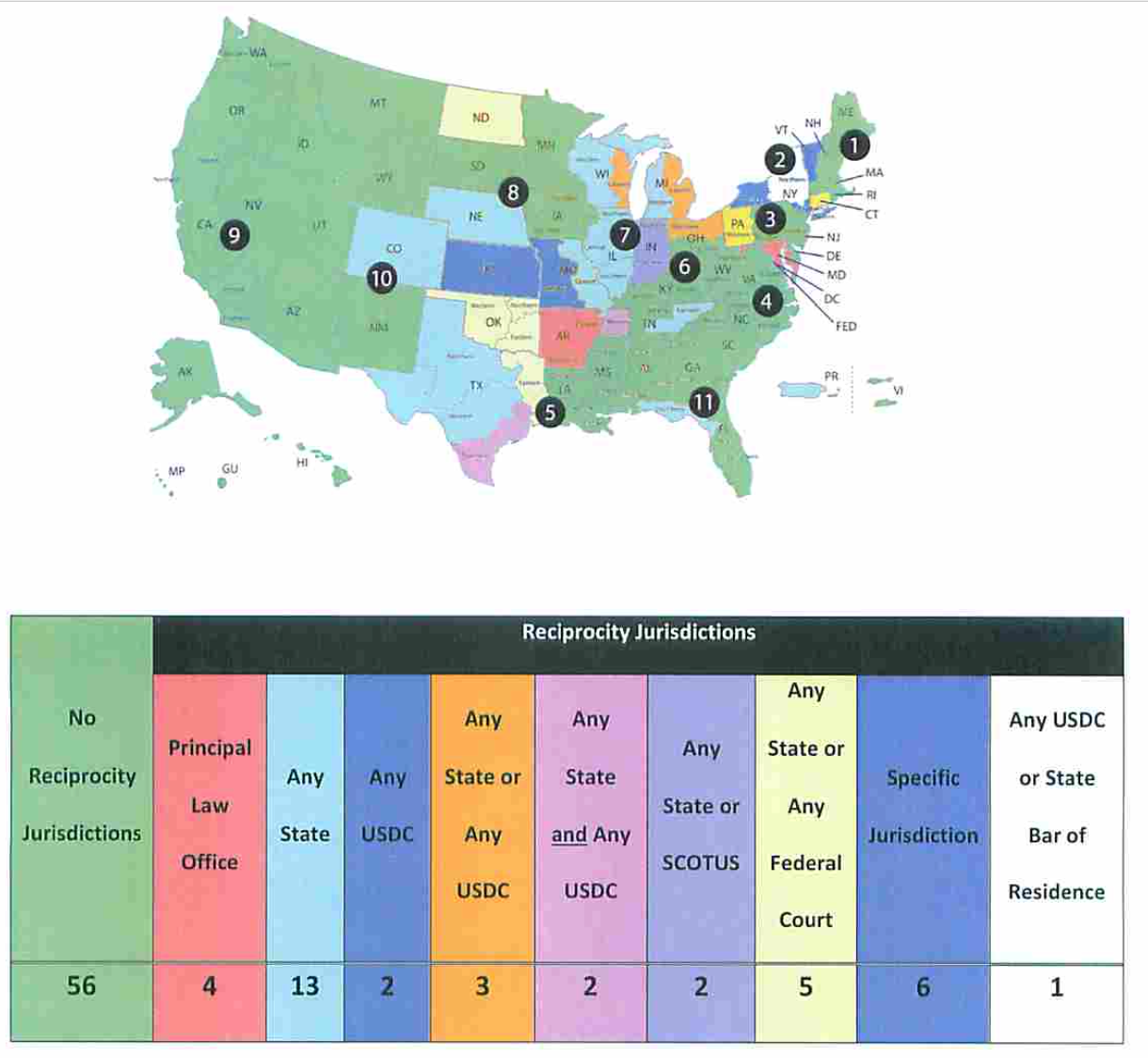
United States District Court Attorney Admissions Reciprocity Map (2015)

In order to represent a party in a case in a district court, a person must be an attorney at law and generally must be admitted to the bar of that particular court. The United States usually does not have a separate bar examination for federal practice (except with respect to patent practice before the United States Patent and Trademark Office). Admission to the bar of a district court is generally available to any attorney who is admitted to practice law in the state where the district court sits. (Note: Nearly all district courts have a Local Rule 11.1 or 83.1 that describes the appropriate state judicial institution which admits attorneys to practice (either the state bar association or an office or committee of the state supreme court).)

56 districts (around 60% of all district courts) require an attorney to be admitted to practice in the state where the district court sits. The other 39 districts (around 40% of all district courts) extend admission to certain lawyers admitted in other states, although conditions vary from court to court. For example, the district courts in New York City (Southern District of New York and Eastern District of New York) extend admission to attorneys admitted to the bar in Connecticut or Vermont and to the district court in that state, but otherwise require attorneys to be admitted to the New York bar. Only 13 districts extend admission to attorneys admitted to any U.S. state bar.

The Northern District of Texas extends attorney admission to members of any state bar, but in most cases, an attorney who does not reside or maintain a principal office in the district is required to designate "local counsel" with a residence or office within 50 miles of the courthouse.

The attorney generally submits an application with a fee and takes the oath of admission. Local practice varies as to whether the oath is given in writing or in open court before a judge of the district. A "sponsor" admitted to the court's bar is often required.

Several district courts require attorneys seeking admission to their bars to take an additional bar examination on federal law, including the Southern District of Ohio, the Northern District of Florida, and the District of Puerto Rico.

Pro hac vice admission is also available in most federal district courts on a case-by-case basis. Most district courts require pro hac vice attorneys to associate with an attorney admitted to practice before the court.

== Appeals ==
Generally, a final ruling by a district court in either a civil or a criminal case can be appealed to the United States court of appeals in the federal judicial circuit in which the district court is located, except that some district court rulings involving patents and certain other specialized matters must be appealed instead to the United States Court of Appeals for the Federal Circuit, and in a very few cases the appeal may be taken directly to the United States Supreme Court.

== Largest and busiest district courts ==
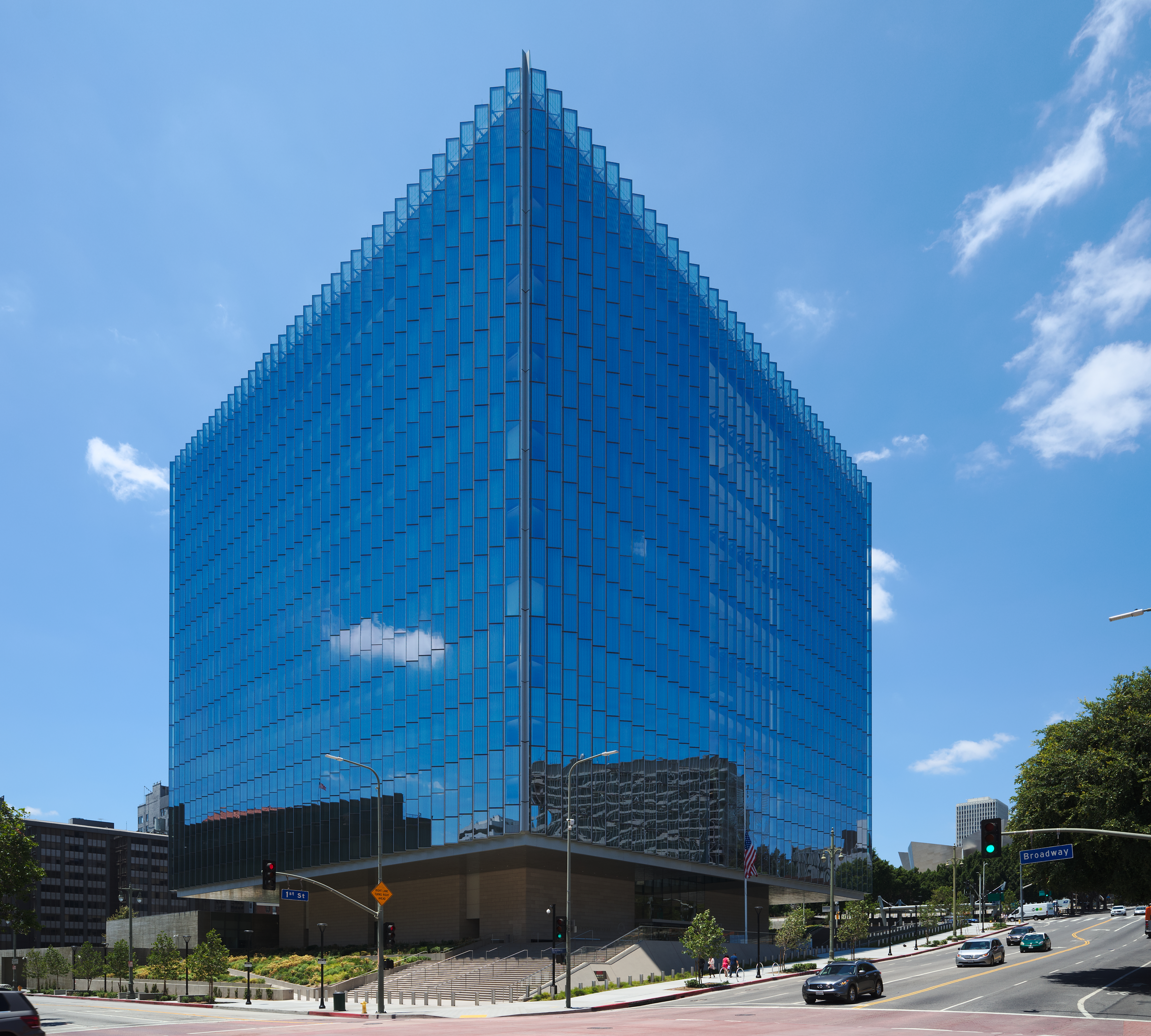
The First Street Courthouse in downtown Los Angeles, California, home to most of the district judges of the Western Division of the Central District of California.

The Central District of California is the largest federal district by population; it includes all five counties that make up Greater Los Angeles. By contrast, New York City and the surrounding metropolitan area are divided between the Southern District of New York (which includes Manhattan, The Bronx and Westchester County) and the Eastern District of New York (which includes Brooklyn, Queens, Staten Island, Nassau County and Suffolk County). New York suburbs in Connecticut and New Jersey are covered by the District of Connecticut and District of New Jersey, respectively.

The Southern District of New York and the Central District of California are the largest federal districts by number of judges, with 28 judges each.

In 2007, the busiest district courts in terms of criminal federal felony filings were the District of New Mexico, Western District of Texas, Southern District of Texas, and the District of Arizona. These four districts all share the border with Mexico. A crackdown on illegal immigration resulted in 75 percent of the criminal cases filed in the 94 district courts in 2007 being filed in these four districts and the other district that borders Mexico, the Southern District of California. The busiest patent litigation court is the United States District Court for the Eastern District of Texas, with the most patent lawsuits filed there nearly every year.

== Extinct district courts ==
=== Subdivided district courts ===
Most extinct district courts have disappeared by being divided into smaller districts. The following courts were subdivided out of existence: Alabama, Arkansas, California, Florida, Georgia, Illinois, Indiana, Iowa, Kentucky, Louisiana, Michigan, Mississippi, Missouri, New York, North Carolina, Ohio, Pennsylvania, Tennessee, Texas, Virginia, Washington, West Virginia, Wisconsin.

=== Other abolished district courts ===
On rare occasions, an extinct district court was extinguished by merging it with other district courts. In every case except one, this has restored a district court that had been subdivided:

- Between 1794 and 1797, the United States District Court for the District of North Carolina was divided into the United States district courts for the districts of Edenton, New Bern, and Wilmington.
- Between 1801 and 1802, the United States District Court for the District of New Jersey was divided into the United States district courts for the districts of East Jersey and West Jersey.
- When California was admitted as a state in 1850, it was initially divided into two districts, the Northern and the Southern. The Southern District of California was abolished on July 27, 1866, and the State made to constitute one district, the statute providing that the Judge of the Northern District exercise the powers of the United States District Court for the District of California, and that all records of the Southern District Court be delivered to the Clerk of the Northern District Court. Twenty years later, on August 5, 1886, Congress re-created the Southern District of California.
- Between 1911 and 1961, the United States District Court for the District of South Carolina was divided into the United States district courts for the Eastern and Western districts of South Carolina.
- The United States District Court for the Eastern District of Illinois was eliminated and a new United States District Court for the Central District of Illinois was created in its place on October 2, 1978.

There are a few additional extinct district courts that fall into neither of the above two patterns.

- From 1801 to 1802, the District of Columbia and pieces of Maryland and Virginia formed the United States District Court for the District of Potomac, which was the first United States district court to cross state lines. During the same period, the United States District Court for the District of Norfolk was carved out of another piece of Virginia. The United States district courts for the districts of Maryland and Virginia remained during this brief period.
- From 1801 to 1802, and again from 1802 to 1872, the state of North Carolina was subdivided into the United States district courts for the districts of Albemarle, Cape Fear, and Pamptico. These courts were extinguished when the state was reorganized into the United States district courts for the Eastern and Western districts of North Carolina.
- United States District Court for the District of Orleans. This court was renamed the United States District Court for the District of Louisiana when the Territory of Orleans became the State of Louisiana.
- United States District Court for the Canal Zone. This court was abolished, effective March 31, 1982, as part of the process of returning the Canal Zone to Panama. Cases then pending in the Canal Zone court were transferred to the United States District Court for the Eastern District of Louisiana in New Orleans.
- United States Court for China. This court functioned as a district court between 1906 and 1943. It had jurisdiction over American citizens in China.

== See also ==
- List of courts of the United States
- Federal tribunals in the United States
- List of United States district and territorial courts
- List of current United States district judges
- United States Marshals Service
