= Neder v. United States =

- Supreme Court of the United States

Argued February 23, 1999 Decided June 10, 1999
- Full case name: Ellis E. Neder, Jr., Petitioner v. United States
- Citations: 527 U.S. 1 (more) 119 S.Ct. 1827, 144 L.Ed.2d 35
- Argument: Oral argument

Case history
- Prior: United States v. Neder, 136 F.3d 1459 (11th Cir. 1998), certiorari granted, 525 U. S. 928 (1998)
- Subsequent: Convictions affirmed on remand, United States v. Neder, 197 F.3d 1122 (11th Cir. 1999)

Holding
- 1. The harmless-error rule of Chapman v. California applies to a jury instruction that omits an element of an offense.; 2. Materiality is an element of a "scheme or artifice to defraud" under the federal mail fraud, wire fraud, and bank fraud statutes.

Court membership
- Chief Justice William Rehnquist Associate Justices John P. Stevens · Sandra Day O'Connor; Antonin Scalia · Anthony Kennedy; David Souter · Clarence Thomas; Ruth Bader Ginsburg · Stephen Breyer

Case opinions
- Majority: Rehnquist, joined by unanimous (Parts I and III); O'Connor, Kennedy, Thomas, Breyer (Parts II and IV)
- Concurrence: Stevens (in part and in judgment)
- Concur/dissent: Scalia, joined by Souter, Ginsburg

Laws applied
- Chapman v. California

Neder v. United States, 527 U.S. 1 (1999), was a United States Supreme Court case decided in 1999. The Court held that the omission of an element of an offense with which a defendant is charged and convicted should be evaluated under the "harmless error" standard that the Court previously described in the 1967 case Chapman v. California. The Court also held that, in order to sustain a conviction under the federal mail, wire, and bank fraud statutes, the government must prove materiality of the underlying conduct.
