= City of Chicago v. Morales =

- Supreme Court of the United States

Argued December 9, 1998 Decided June 10, 1999
- Full case name: City of Chicago, Petitioner v. Jesus Morales, et al.
- Citations: 527 U.S. 41 (more) 119 S. Ct. 1849; 144 L. Ed. 2d 67; 1999 U.S. LEXIS 4005; 67 U.S.L.W. 4415; 72 A.L.R.5th 665; 99 Cal. Daily Op. Service 4488; 99 Daily Journal DAR 5760; 1999 Colo. J. C.A.R. 3223; 12 Fla. L. Weekly Fed. S 331

Case history
- Prior: 177 Ill. 2d 440, 687 N.E.2d 53, affirmed.

Holding
- Chicago's Gang Congregation Ordinance violates due process in that it is impermissibly vague on its face and an arbitrary restriction on personal liberties.

Court membership
- Chief Justice William Rehnquist Associate Justices John P. Stevens · Sandra Day O'Connor; Antonin Scalia · Anthony Kennedy; David Souter · Clarence Thomas; Ruth Bader Ginsburg · Stephen Breyer

Case opinions
- Majority: Stevens (parts I, II, and V), joined by O'Connor, Kennedy, Souter, Ginsburg, Breyer
- Plurality: Stevens (parts III, IV, VI), joined by Souter, Ginsburg
- Concurrence: O'Connor (in part and in judgment), joined by Breyer
- Concurrence: Kennedy (in part and in judgment)
- Concurrence: Breyer (in part and in judgment)
- Dissent: Scalia
- Dissent: Thomas, joined by Rehnquist, Scalia

Laws applied
- U.S. Const. amend. XIV

City of Chicago v. Morales, 527 U.S. 41 (1999), is a United States Supreme Court case in which the Court held that a law cannot be so vague that a person of ordinary intelligence can not figure out what is innocent activity and what is illegal.

== Background ==
Under the Chicago Municipal Code § 8-4-015 (added June 17, 1992), loitering was a crime.

The facts of the case were:

Chicago’s Gang Congregation Ordinance prohibit[ed] "criminal street gang members" from loitering in public places. Under the ordinance, if a police officer observes a person whom he reasonably believes to be a gang member loitering in a public place with one or more persons, he shall order them to disperse. Anyone who does not promptly obey such an order has violated the ordinance. The police department’s General Order 92—4 ... [had a provision] providing for designated, but publicly undisclosed, enforcement areas. Two trial judges upheld the ordinance’s constitutionality, but eleven others ruled it invalid. The Illinois Appellate Court affirmed the latter cases and reversed the convictions in the former. The Illinois Supreme Court affirmed, holding that the ordinance violates due process in that it is impermissibly vague on its face and an arbitrary restriction on personal liberties.

— Summary of the case, City of Chicago v. Morales, Supreme Court of the United States, No. 97—1121.

More specifically, "In 1993, Jesus Morales was arrested and found guilty under the ordinance for loitering in a Chicago neighborhood after he ignored police orders to disperse. Ultimately, after Morales challenged his arrest, the Illinois Supreme Court held that the ordinance violated due process of law in that it is impermissibly vague on its face and an arbitrary restriction on personal liberties." The United States Supreme Court affirmed the Supreme Court of Illinois' judgment.

== Issue and holding ==
The only issue on certiorari was whether the ordinance was unconstitutionally vague, either on its face or as applied, in violation of "the Due Process Clause of the Fourteenth Amendment to the U.S. Constitution."

The United States Supreme Court held in this case that a law cannot be so vague that a person of ordinary intelligence cannot figure out what is innocent activity and what is illegal.

== Rationale ==
Justice John Paul Stevens, writing for the plurality, said that the:

ordinance's definition of loitering as "to remain in any one place with no apparent purpose" does not give people adequate notice of what is prohibited and what is permitted, even if a person does not violate the law until he refuses to disperse. "'[A] law fails to meet the requirements of the Due Process Clause if it is so vague and standardless that it leaves the public uncertain as to the conduct it prohibits,'" noted Justice Stevens, "[i]f the loitering is in fact harmless and innocent, the dispersal order itself is an unjustified impairment of liberty."

— Summary by Oyez.com.

Stevens, writing for the majority, further investigated the Due Process issues of the ordinance.

Firstly, the Court discussed the ordinance's failure to satisfy the fair notice requirement. Loitering under the ordinance's language was an act that could be used arbitrarily to identify community members by the police. Community members would not have proper notice as the "notice" they received would have been retroactively given when the police arrested the individual. The language of the dispersal order needed to be more specific as it needed to have set the required guidelines people followed when dispersing. The Court questioned, "How long must the loiterers remain apart?" Overall, the Court found that ordinance to be so vague that it stops the public from being able to follow it. Secondly, the Court deemed the ordinance to violate the "requirement that a legislature establish minimal guidelines to govern law enforcement." This ordinance gave power, without bounds, to the police to determine who violated the ordinance. Overall, the majority concluded that the ordinance needs more definiteness and clarity. Six justices ultimately sided with Morales, and three with the City of Chicago.

However, only three justices agreed on all of the rationales and the complete holding, namely Stevens, Souter, and Ginsburg. O'Connor, Kennedy, and Breyer had concurring opinions. One particular "sticking point" was whether "It is a criminal law that contains no mens rea requirement ... and infringes on constitutionally protected rights...." Only Stevens, joined by Justice Souter and Justice Ginsburg, could agree on that.

== Impact ==
The ACLU claimed a win in this case.
