= Grupo Mexicano de Desarrollo, S.A. v. Alliance Bond Fund, Inc. =

- Supreme Court of the United States

Argued March 31, 1999 Decided June 17, 1999
- Full case name: Grupo Mexicano de Desarrollo, S.A. v. Alliance Bond Fund, Inc.
- Docket no.: 98-231
- Citations: 527 U.S. 308 (more) 119 S. Ct. 1961; 144 L. Ed. 2d 319
- Argument: Oral argument
- Opinion announcement: Opinion announcement

Case history
- Procedural: Prior history: Preliminary injunction granted, Alliance Bond Fund, Inc. v. Grupo Mexicano de Desarrollo, S.A. (S.D.N.Y. December 23, 1997); Summary judgment and permanent injunction granted (S.D.N.Y. April 17, 1998); Preliminary injunction affirmed, 143 F.3d 688 (2d Cir. May 6, 1998); Certiorari granted, 525 U.S. 1015 (November 30, 1998); Subsequent: Vacated in part and remanded, 190 F.3d 16 (2d Cir. August 20, 1999)

Questions presented
- Is a United States District Court empowered to issue a preliminary injunction prohibiting a defendant from transferring or assigning assets unrelated to the plaintiff's underlying claim and held outside of the court’s jurisdiction in order to ensure that funds will be available to satisfy a potential money judgment?

Holding
- The district court lacked authority to preliminarily enjoin petitioners from disposing of their assets pending adjudication of a claim for money damages because such a remedy was historically unavailable from a court of equity.

Court membership
- Chief Justice William Rehnquist Associate Justices John P. Stevens · Sandra Day O'Connor; Antonin Scalia · Anthony Kennedy; David Souter · Clarence Thomas; Ruth Bader Ginsburg · Stephen Breyer

Case opinions
- Majority: Scalia, joined by unanimous (Part II); Rehnquist, O'Connor, Kennedy, Thomas
- Concur/dissent: Ginsburg, joined by Stevens, Souter, Breyer

Laws applied
- Judiciary Act of 1789

Grupo Mexicano de Desarrollo, S.A. v. Alliance Bond Fund, Inc., 527 U.S. 308 (1999), commonly called Grupo Mexicano, was a United States Supreme Court case in which the court struck down—as beyond the equitable remedies authorized by Congress—a preliminary injunction used to freeze the assets of the defendants pending a final judgment.

The Supreme Court stated that the equitable remedies authorized by the Judiciary Act of 1789 are limited to remedies that were available in courts of equity at that time, particularly from the Lord Chancellor in the English Court of Chancery. Because Congress had not created a new asset-freezing remedy, and because such an injunction was not traditionally available from the Court of Chancery, the Supreme Court held that it was not available in U.S. courts.

The dissenting justices agreed that this type of injunction was not traditionally available in 1789 but argued that equitable remedies can evolve with new circumstances, and that the modern ease of international transfer of assets justified this novel use of a preliminary injunction.

== Background ==
=== Legal background ===
The main issue was whether U.S. federal courts had authority to issue a type of order, known in Commonwealth countries as a Mareva injunction (or, in plainer language, a freezing order), which prohibits a defendant in a civil case from transferring assets likely needed to pay for a later final judgment. This kind of injunction originated in the English Court of Appeal in the 1975 case of Mareva Compania Naviera S.A. v. International Bulkcarriers S.A., (Note: [1975] 2 Lloyd's Rep. 509, [1980] 1 All ER 213.) which had departed from earlier practice denying asset-freezing injunctions.

In the United States, prejudgment attachment has long served a similar function. A writ of attachment allows a court to seize a defendant's property before trial. As originally used in England, attachment was limited to coercing a defendant to appear in court. In the United States, however, the property is seized instead for eventual use to satisfy a final judgment. Hence, the decision in Mareva arose from a perceived gap in English law, whereas attachment had mostly already filled that gap in American law.

However, freezing injunctions and attachment are not identical in effect. Because injunctions act on persons rather than on property, a Mareva injunction can prohibit a defendant from transferring assets regardless of where those assets are located. The court needs to have jurisdiction over the defendant and not necessarily over the defendant's property. In contrast, New York's attachment statute only allowed seizure of property located in the state.

=== Factual background ===
In 1994, Grupo Mexicano de Desarrollo (GMD), a company involved in the construction of public works in Mexico and Latin America, took out loans of $250 million from institutional investors. At the time, GMD was heavily invested in a toll-roads program of the Mexican government. The loan agreement included a provision requiring GMD to give the loans equal footing with its other unsecured debt. It also included a forum-selection clause that allowed claims for breach of contract to be filed in New York.

The toll-road investments turned out to be much less profitable than expected. By 1997, GMD was at risk of being unable to repay its debts. It failed to make required interest payments on the loan agreement and reported a net worth of negative $214 million. And while restructuring its debt, GMD had been giving priority to its creditors in Mexico, including the Mexican government and GMD's former employees.

=== District court ===
Alliance Bond Fund, Inc., a group of investors who were owed $75.8 million of the $250 million loans, sued GMD for breach of contract, seeking money damages of $80.9 million for the accelerated principal plus interest. Alliance also sought a temporary restraining order and preliminary injunction prohibiting GMD from assigning some of its assets (called the "toll road notes") to other creditors until there was a final judgment in the case.

Alliance filed the case in the Southern District of New York – the federal district court in Manhattan. Since the dispute was against a foreign defendant, the federal courts had subject-matter jurisdiction based on diversity of citizenship.

Alliance and GMD both agreed that New York law did not allow an asset-freezing preliminary injunction like the one Alliance sought. Instead, Alliance argued that an injunction was proper under the Federal Rules of Civil Procedure.

The district judge, John S. Martin Jr., granted the temporary restraining order on the same day that the case was filed. On December 23, after a pair of hearings, Judge Martin granted a preliminary injunction, finding that Alliance "would almost certainly succeed on their breach of contract claims against GMD" and that "without the injunction they faced an irreparable injury since GMD's financial condition and dissipation of assets would frustrate any judgment recovered". He also ordered Alliance to post a $50,000 bond in order to obtain the injunction.

On April 17, 1998, Judge Martin granted summary judgment in favor of Alliance, awarding $82.5 million in damages. He also issued an order to GMD to transfer or assign the toll road notes to Alliance (known as the "turnover order") and converted the preliminary injunction into a permanent one, which would end after those notes had been turned over to Alliance.

GMD did not contest the money judgment. However, it appealed the preliminary injunction as going beyond permitted federal injunctive relief and appealed the turnover order as not authorized by New York law.

=== Court of appeal ===
The preliminary injunction was unanimously affirmed by a panel of the U.S. Court of Appeals for the Second Circuit. Judge Joseph M. McLaughlin wrote the panel opinion, joined by Pierre N. Leval and Milton Pollack (a district judge of the Southern District of New York sitting by designation).

=== Supreme Court briefing ===
The Solicitor General, Seth P. Waxman, filed an amicus brief for the United States in support of the respondents. Waxman argued that the appealed preliminary injunction was analogous to the traditional equitable remedy of a creditor's bill. He acknowledged that a creditor's bill was traditionally unavailable to creditor without a final judgment but said that an exception might apply – without pointing to any applicable exception. Rather, he said that "any such [historical] debate is an arid one."

Two other amicus briefs were filed. The Dominican Republic argued that the Second Circuit's decision intruded on other countries' sovereignty over property within their jurisdiction. The Securities Industry Association and Emerging Markets Traders Association argued that comity with foreign countries is an issue for a court to consider in deciding whether to grant an injunction, but does not limit the court's power.

== Opinion of the Court ==
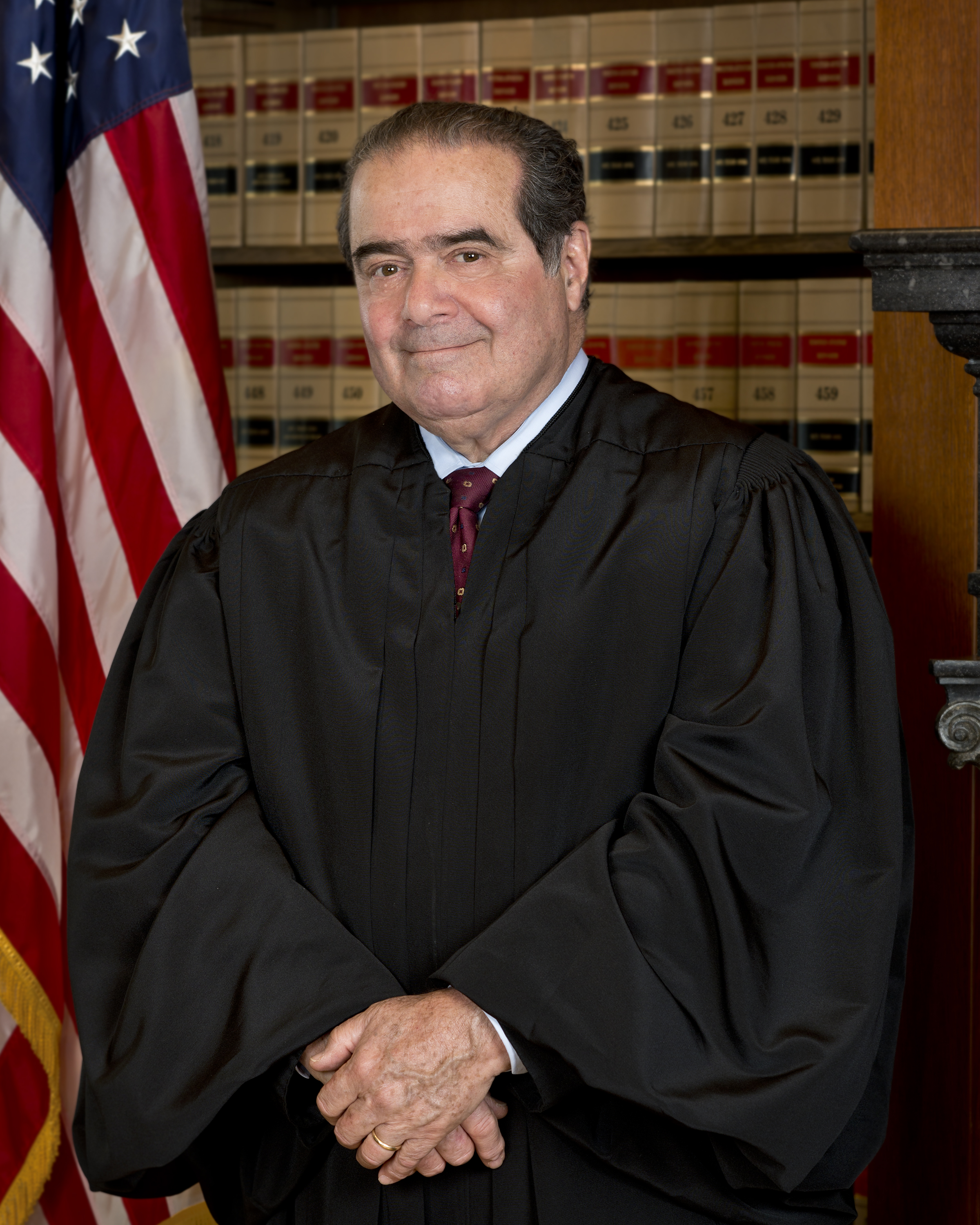
Justice Antonin Scalia wrote the opinion of the Supreme Court.

Justice Scalia delivered the majority opinion. In part I, (Note: Grupo Mexicano, 527 U.S. at 310–13.) he stated the facts of the case. In part II, (Note: Grupo Mexicano, 527 U.S. at 313–18.) which was joined by all nine justices, he concluded that the case was not moot.

In part III, (Note: Grupo Mexicano, 527 U.S. at 318–13.) the majority concluded that the district court did not have authority to issue the challenged preliminary injunction. The majority indicated that the Judiciary Act of 1789's grant of equity jurisdiction was limited by the bounds of equity as practiced around that time in the English Court of Chancery. The majority rejected the argument of the United States government in its amicus brief that the injunction was analogous to the equitable action for a creditor's bill, since that was generally only available after a final judgment. It rejected the dissent's view that equity was flexible enough to grant preliminary asset-freezing injunction that had not previously been available:

We do not question the proposition that equity is flexible; but in the federal system, at least, that flexibility is confined within the broad boundaries of traditional equitable relief. To accord a type of relief that has never been available before – and especially (as here) a type of relief that has been specifically disclaimed by longstanding judicial precedent – is to invoke a "default rule," [...] not of flexibility but of omnipotence.

In part IV, (Note: Grupo Mexicano, 517 U.S. at 329–33.) the majority noted some policy arguments for and against Mareva injunctions but declined to take a side, saying that it should be left to Congress to consider.

In closing, the majority quoted an excerpt from Justice Joseph Story's treatise on equity, which in turn quoted the famous criticism of equity by the English jurist John Selden:

"If, indeed, a Court of Equity in England did possess the unbounded jurisdiction, which has been thus generally ascribed to it, of correcting, controlling, moderating, and even superseding the law, and of enforcing all the rights, as well as charities, arising from natural law and justice, and of freeing itself from all regard to former rules and precedents, it would be the most gigantic in its sway, and the most formidable instrument of arbitrary power, that could well be devised. [...] A Court of Chancery might then well deserve the spirited rebuke of Seldon; 'For law we have a measure, and know what to trust to—Equity is according to the conscience of him, that is Chancellor; and as that is larger, or narrower, so is Equity. 'T is all one, as if they should make the standard for the measure the Chancellor's foot. What an uncertain measure would this be? One Chancellor has a long foot; another a short foot; a third an indifferent foot. It is the same thing with the Chancellor's conscience.'" 1 Commentaries on Equity Jurisprudence § 19, at 21.

And ended by saying: "Because such a remedy was historically unavailable from a court of equity, we hold that the District Court had no authority to issue a preliminary injunction preventing petitioners from disposing of their assets pending adjudication of respondents' contract claim for money damages."

== Dissent in part ==
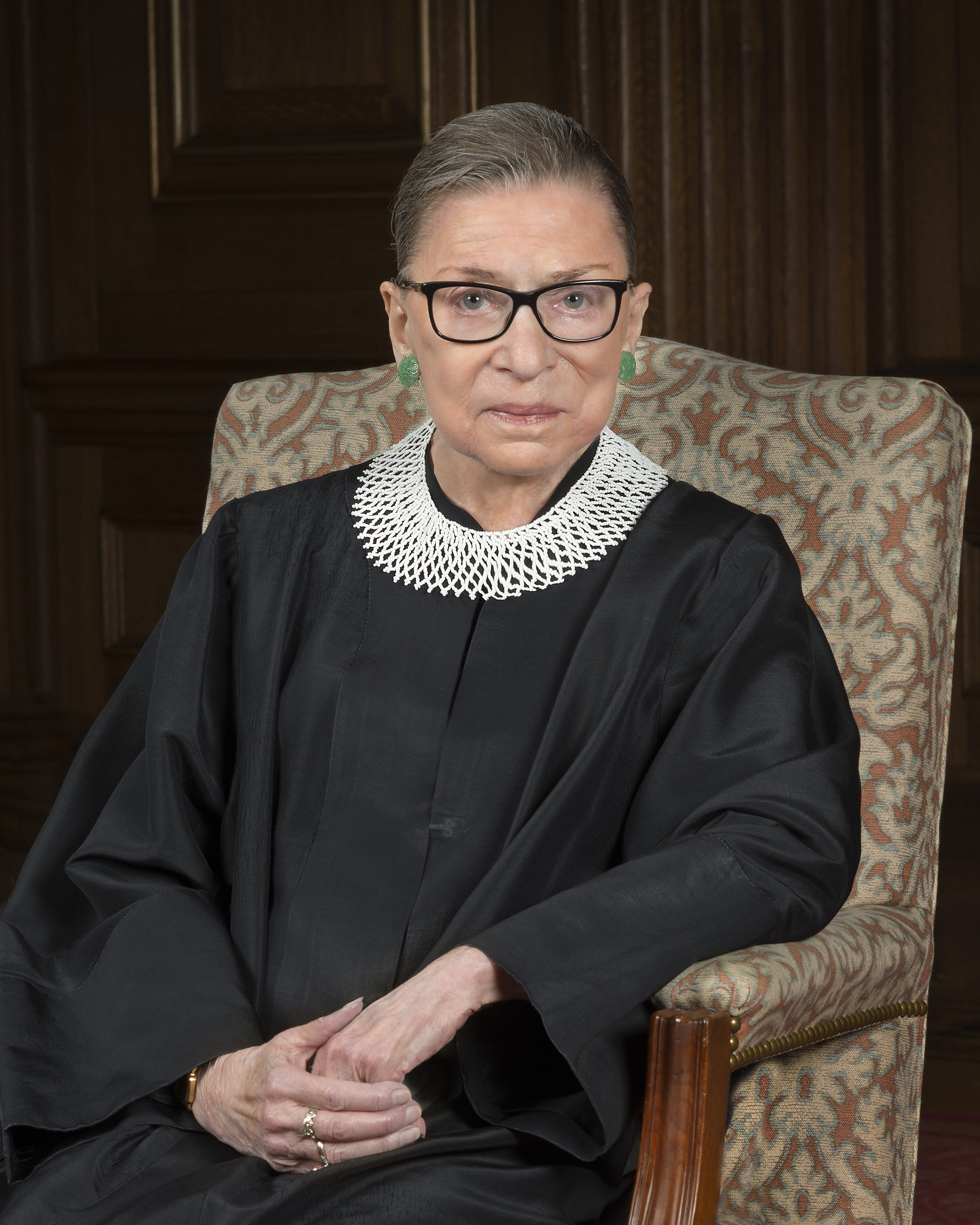
Justice Ruth Bader Ginsburg wrote for four justices concurring in part and dissenting in part.

Justice Ginsburg wrote the dissenting opinion, joined by Justices Stevens, Souter, and Breyer. They concurred only in the portion of the majority opinion holding that the case was not moot.

Ginsburg was concerned that the majority's tradition-based test in Grupo Mexicano would cut back at constitutional remedies as expanded in the 20th century.

Ginsburg delivered an oral dissent, one of the 19 cases in which she did so during her time on the Supreme Court. In her dissent, she wrote:

In my view, the Court relies on an unjustifiably static conception of equity jurisdiction. From the beginning, we have defined the scope of federal equity in relation to the principles of equity existing at the separation of this country from England [...]; we have never limited federal equity jurisdiction to the specific practices and remedies of the pre-Revolutionary Chancellor.

== Subsequent developments ==
Grupo Mexicano was the first of a series of decisions of the Supreme Court reemphasizing distinctions between legal and equitable remedies. It embraced an originalist test for when injunctive relief is available. For the first time, the court rejected an equitable remedy on the basis that it had not been available in England around the time that the United States was founded.

Some scholars criticized the majority for its narrow view of the judicial role in remedies. Lower courts such as the First and Ninth Circuit have read the holding in Grupo Mexicano narrowly to avoid broader implications in for remedies in other areas.

In 2012 the Uniform Law Commission proposed a Uniform Asset-Freezing Orders Act, renamed in 2014 the Uniform Asset-Preservation Orders Act, as a solution to the lack of Mareva injunctions in the United States. The American Bar Association endorsed the proposal in 2013. However, as of 2018, no state had enacted the proposed statute.

== Works cited ==
- Samuel Bray, The Supreme Court and the New Equity, 68 Vand. L. Rev. 997 (2015).
- Stephen B. Burbank, The Bitter with the Sweet: Tradition, History, and Limitations on Federal Judicial Power—A Case Study, 75 Notre Dame L. Rev. 1291 (2000).
- Lawrence Collins, The Territorial Reach of Mareva Injunctions, 105 L.Q. Rev. 262 (1989).
- Anna Conley, A Challenge to Equitable Originalism – The History of Injunctions as a Principle-Based Adaptable Judicial Power, 17 N.Y.U. J.L. & Liberty 112 (2023).
- Richard H. Fallon Jr., Constitutional Remedies: In One Era and out the Other, 136 Harv. L. Rev. 1300 (2023).
- Alexander Firsichbaum, The Uniform Asset-Preservation Orders Act: Quieting the Alarms with Lessons From Abroad, 2018 Rutgers U. L. Rev. Commentaries 1.
- Jay E. Grenig, Can a U.S. District Court Enjoin a Defendant from Transferring or Assigning Assets Held Outside of the Court's Jurisdiction?, 1998-99 Term Preview U.S. Sup. Ct. Cas. 311.
- Randolph J. Haines, The Conservative Assault on Federal Equity, 88 Am. Bankr. L.J. 451 (2014).
- Riley T. Keenan, Functional Federal Equity, 74 Ala. L. Rev. 879 (2023).
- Andrew Kull, Equity's Atrophy, 97 Notre Dame L. Rev. 1801 (2022).
- Richard H.W. Maloy, Expansive Equity Jurisprudence: A Court Divided, 40 Suffolk U. L. Rev. 641 (2007).
- James E. Pfander & Wade Formo, The Past and Future of Equitable Remedies: An Essay for Frank Johnson, 71 Ala. L. Rev. 723 (2020).
- Judith Resnik, Constricting Remedies: The Rehnquist Judiciary, Congress, and Federal Power, 78 Ind. L.J. 223 (2003).
- William Savitt, Some Personal Reflections on Ruth Bader Ginsburg’s Contribution to Business Law, 121 Colum. L. Rev. 623 (2021).
- Henry E. Smith, Equity as Meta-Law, 130 Yale L.J. 1050 (2021).
- Christine Venter, Dissenting from the Bench, 56 Wake Forest L. Rev. 321 (2021).
