= Loitering =

Remaining in a place without an apparent purpose

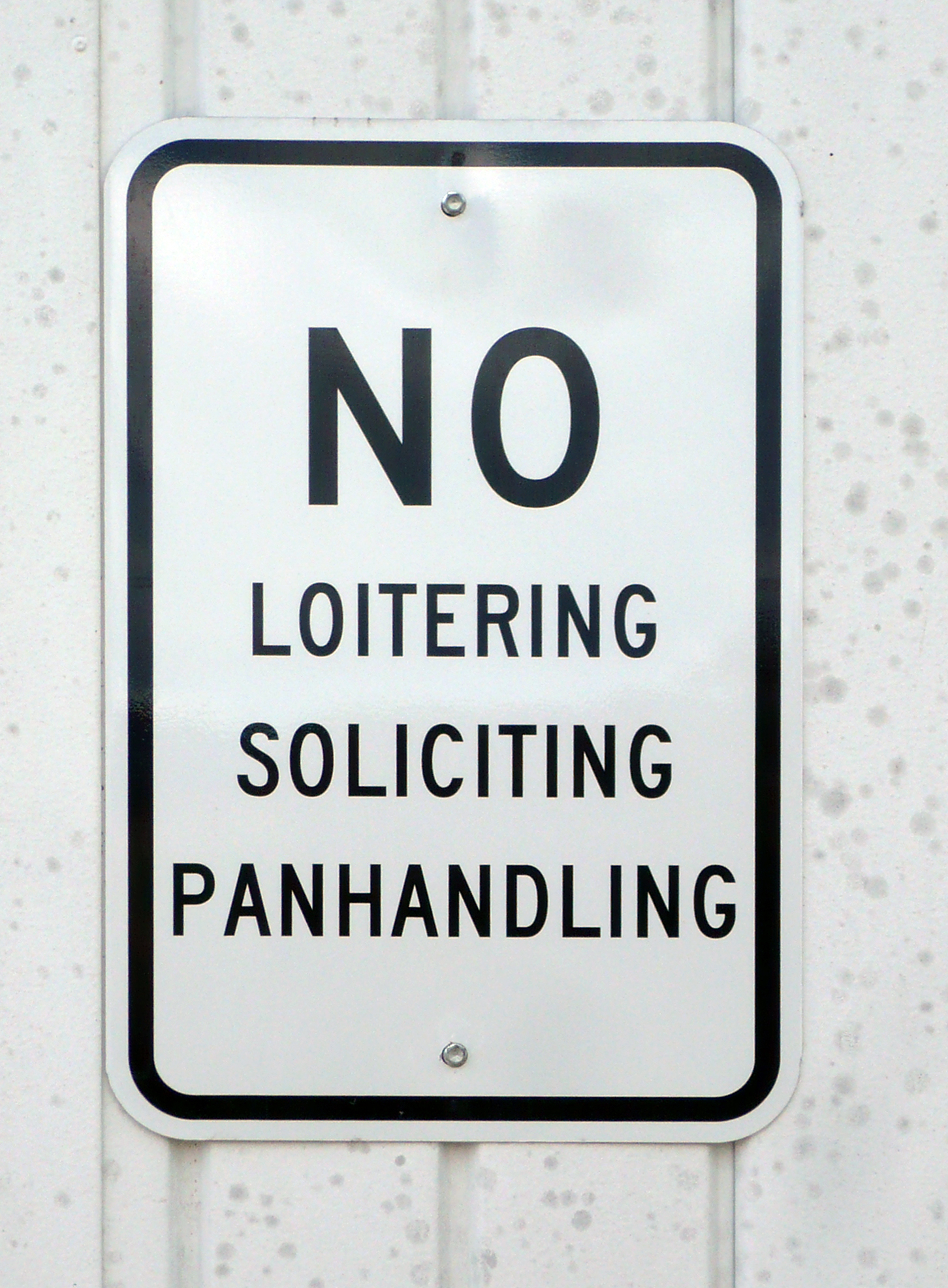
"No Loitering" sign in Fortuna, California

Loitering is the act of standing or waiting around idly without apparent purpose in some public places. While the laws regarding loitering have been challenged and changed over time, loitering of suspect people can be illegal in some jurisdictions and some specific circumstances.

== Prohibition and history ==
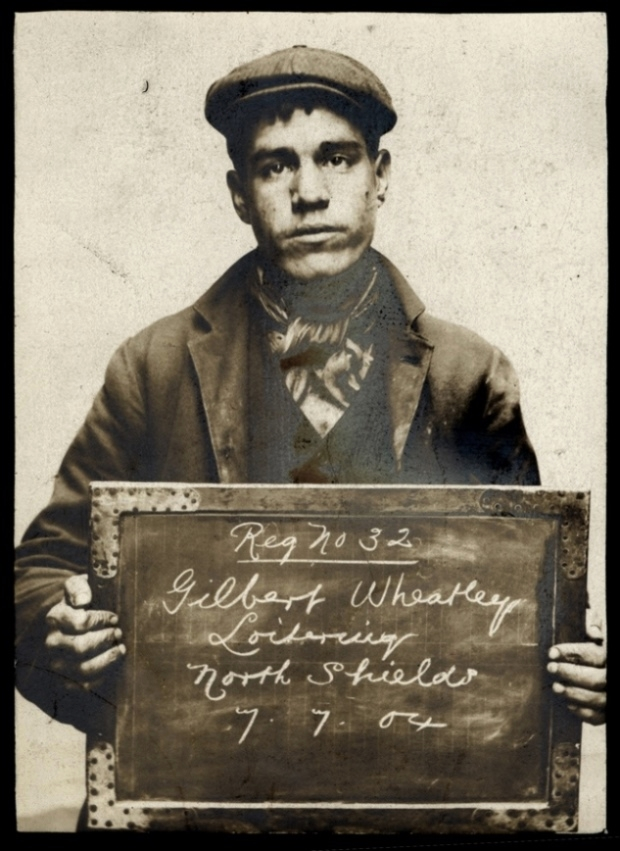
Gilbert Wheatley, arrested in England on 7 July 1904, for loitering with intent to commit a felony

While not being a crime by itself, loitering has historically been treated as an inherent preceding offense to other forms of public crime and disorder, such as prostitution, begging, public drunkenness, dealing in stolen goods, drug dealing, scams, organized crime, robbery, harassment/mobbing, etc.

Loitering provides a lesser offence that can be used by police to confront and deter suspect individuals from lingering in a high-crime area, especially when criminal intent is suspected but not observed.

Local areas vary on the degree to which police are empowered to arrest or disperse loiterers; limitations on their power are sometimes made over concerns regarding racial profiling and unnecessary use of police force. The offense remains highly subjective.

=== Australia ===
Police officers can generally issue 'move on' directions to prevent loitering in a public place, but only based on a reasonable suspicion of the following (varying by jurisdiction):

- the person or group is causing anxiety, being obstructive, or interfering with trade or disrupting the peace;
- the person or group is disorderly, indecent, offensive or threatening;
- the person or group is soliciting for prostitution or drugs;
- the person or group has committed, will commit, or is in the vicinity of an offence or breach of the peace; or
- the person or group is in danger.

Additional provisions may apply depending on the circumstances, i.e. if the offender is intoxicated, or is a sex offender.

=== England and Wales ===
The Vagrancy Act 1824 was designed to prevent suspects and infamous thieves from "lingering about" certain places. This was modified slightly by 34 & 35 Vict. c.112, the Prevention of Crimes Act 1871, and 54 & 55 Vict. c.69, the Penal Servitude Act 1891, which introduced the phrase "loitering with intent". The Vagrancy Act 1898 was passed, then both were repealed by the Sexual Offences Act 2003.

The Vagrancy Act 1824 permits in section 6 "any person whatsoever" to apprehend offenders and to bring them directly before a Justice of the Peace. The same section creates a duty on "any Constable or other Peace Officer" to apprehend and bring them before a justice of the peace, or be charged with "Neglect of Duty", punishable in section 11 by a fine of five pounds or three months in jail. The same Act provides disbursements from the general funds of Council for expenses of Prosecutors and Witnesses. Classes of persons that the Act was designed to dissuade, on penalty of three months at hard labor, include:

- unlicensed salesmen
- common prostitutes
- beggars and alms gatherers, or those procuring children to do so
- fortune tellers
- palm readers
- obscenity mongers
- exhibitionists
- fraudulent charity gatherers
- promoters and players of games of chance
- persons with instruments of assault
- persons with instruments of robbery and break-in
- persons found in or upon real property
- and others besides

The law was also used to criminalize men who were found in areas where men picked each other up for sex.

=== Ireland ===
A statute of the Kingdom of Ireland was enacted in 1635 "for the erecting of Houses of Correction and for the punishment of rogues, vagabonds, sturdy beggars and other lewd and idle persons". Many other laws in the 17th–19th centuries targeted vagrants.

The Offences Against the Person Act 1861 stated, "Any constable or peace officer may take into custody, without a warrant, any person whom he shall find lying or loitering in any highway, yard, or other place during the night, and whom he shall have good cause to suspect of having committed or being about to commit any felony in this Act mentioned, and shall take such person as soon as reasonably may be before a justice of the peace, to be dealt with according to law."

Today in Ireland, the Criminal Justice (Public Order) Act, 1994 allows the Garda Síochána to order to move on any person who "without lawful authority or reasonable excuse, is acting in a manner which consists of loitering in a public place in circumstances, which may include the company of other persons, that give rise to a reasonable apprehension for the safety of persons or the safety of property or for the maintenance of the public peace," and to arrest anyone who does not follow their orders; on conviction, the penalty is a fine of up to €1,000 or up to 6 months' imprisonment.

=== New Zealand ===
Loitering in public is not illegal in New Zealand, but it is an offence to loiter with the intent to commit an imprisonable offence.

=== Spain ===
The Loitering and Ruffianry Law (in Spanish: "Ley de Vagos y Maleantes") of August 4, 1933, aimed to address issues related to vagrants, nomads, procurers, and other behaviors deemed antisocial. Popularly known as "La Gandula", the law gained consensus approval from all political groups during the Second Republic, with the intention of controlling beggars, unskilled ruffians, and procurers.

Rather than imposing penalties, the law focused on preventative measures, including distancing, monitoring, and retaining individuals deemed potentially dangerous until their perceived threat had subsided. Under the law, internment camps known as "Reformatories for Vagrants and Ruffians" were established. This allowed for the arbitrary use of the law to persecute loitering and also to suppress individuals without means, both during the Second Republic and later during the Franco regime.

During Francoist Spain, this law was strictly applied, particularly to individuals who were often petty thieves or merely unemployed, falling under the category of habitual vagrants. Paradoxically, those with higher purchasing power, such as "advantage players and ruffians", human traffickers, or procurers, rarely faced the harsh consequences of this law due to their legal defenses and financial means. News reports of the time often featured sentences handed down under the Vagrancy and Ruffianry Act, which routinely sentenced individuals to one to three years of internment in what were essentially "concentration camps," as dictated by the local courts.

Furthermore, the Franco regime further amended the law on July 15, 1954, to include the repression of homosexuals. In 1970, the law was replaced by another, the Law on Dangerousness and Social Rehabilitation, with similar terms but included sentences of up to five years of internment in prisons or asylums for homosexuals and other individuals deemed socially dangerous for the purpose of rehabilitation, maintaining loitering within its terms. Despite the law not being applied during the democratic period, it remained in force until its complete repeal in 1995.

=== United States ===
In several jurisdictions, persons required to register as a sex offender are prohibited from loitering within a defined distance of schools, parks, or other places in which children may congregate.

In 1992, the city of Chicago adopted an anti-loitering law aimed at restricting gang related activity, especially violent crime and drug trafficking. The law, which defined loitering as "remain[ing] in any one place with no apparent purpose", gave police officers a right to disperse such persons. In cases of disobedience, the law provided a punishment by fine, imprisonment or community service. It was ruled unlawful by the Supreme Court of the United States (Chicago v. Morales, 527 U.S. 41 (1999)) as unacceptably vague by not giving citizens clear guidelines on what acceptable conduct was. In 2000, the city adopted a revised version of the ordinance, in an attempt to eliminate the unconstitutional elements. Loitering was then defined as "remaining in any one place under circumstances that would warrant a reasonable person to believe that the purpose or effect of that behavior is to enable a criminal street gang to establish control over identifiable areas, to intimidate others from entering those areas, or to conceal illegal activities."

== See also ==
- Homelessness
- Vagrancy, homelessness without regular employment or income
- Tramp, long-term homeless person who travels as a vagrant
- Anti-homelessness legislation
- Stop and identify statutes
- Mopery, name for minor offenses, derived from the verb to mope meaning "to wander aimlessly"
- The Mosquito, anti-loitering sonic device
- Freedom to roam
- Jaywalking
