= Dickinson v. Zurko =

- Supreme Court of the United States

Argued March 24, 1999 Decided June 10, 1999
- Full case name: Q. Todd Dickinson, Acting Commissioner of Patents and Trademarks v. Mary E. Zurko, et al.
- Docket no.: 98-377
- Citations: 527 U.S. 150 (more) 119 S. Ct. 1816; 144 L. Ed. 2d 143; 1999 U.S. LEXIS 4004; 50 U.S.P.Q. (BNA) 1930
- Argument: Oral argument

Case history
- Prior: Patent application 07/479,666 filed, February 13, 1990; Examiner's rejection affirmed by Board of Patent Appeals and Interferences, Ex parte Zurko, et al., July 31, 1995 (_ USPQ 2d _, Appeal No. 94-3967); request for reconsideration denied, December 1, 1995; Board decision reversed, In re Zurko, et al. 111 F.3d 887 (Fed. Cir. 1997); reheard, Board decision reversed, 142 F.3d 1447 (Fed. Cir. 1998) (en banc); petition for writ of certiorari granted, 525 U.S. 961 (1998)
- Subsequent: Board decision reversed on remand, In re Zurko, et al. 258 F.3d 1379 (Fed. Cir. 2001); issued as patent 6,507,909 on January 14, 2003

Holding
- Appeals from the USPTO Board of Patent Appeals and Interferences are to be reviewed for whether the Board's conclusions are supported by "substantial evidence" under the APA.

Court membership
- Chief Justice William Rehnquist Associate Justices John P. Stevens · Sandra Day O'Connor; Antonin Scalia · Anthony Kennedy; David Souter · Clarence Thomas; Ruth Bader Ginsburg · Stephen Breyer

Case opinions
- Majority: Breyer, joined by Stevens, O'Connor, Scalia, Souter, Thomas
- Dissent: Rehnquist, joined by Kennedy, Ginsburg

Laws applied
- 5 U.S.C. § 706

Dickinson v. Zurko, 527 U.S. 150 (1999), was a United States Supreme Court case in which the Court held that appeals from the USPTO Board of Patent Appeals and Interferences are to be reviewed for whether the Board's conclusions are supported by "substantial evidence" under the APA.

The Court was asked by the United States Patent and Trademark Office to decide whether the Office's reviewing court, the Court of Appeals for the Federal Circuit, should review the agency's factual determinations for whether the Office's decisions were supported with substantial evidence (under the Administrative Procedure Act), or whether the evidence was clearly erroneous (such as how a lower court would be reviewed). Agreeing with the PTO, the Supreme Court ruled 6-3 that the Office need only have substantial evidence.
