= Florida Prepaid Postsecondary Education Expense Board v. College Savings Bank =

- Supreme Court of the United States

Argued April 20, 1999 Decided June 23, 1999
- Full case name: Florida Prepaid Postsecondary Education Expense Board v. College Savings Bank and United States
- Citations: 527 U.S. 627 (more) 119 S. Ct. 2199; 144 L. Ed. 2d 575; 67 U.S.L.W. 3683; 67 U.S.L.W. 4580; 135 Ed. Law Rep. 342; 51 U.S.P.Q.2d 1081; 99 Cal. Daily Op. Serv. 4945; 1999 Daily Journal D.A.R. 6371; 1999 CJ C.A.R. 3688; 12 Fla. L. Weekly Fed. S 458

Case history
- Prior: 148 F.3d 1343 (Fed. Cir. 1998)

Holding
- The Patent and Plant Variety Protection Remedy Clarification Act did not constitutionally abrogate the states' sovereign immunity.

Court membership
- Chief Justice William Rehnquist Associate Justices John P. Stevens · Sandra Day O'Connor; Antonin Scalia · Anthony Kennedy; David Souter · Clarence Thomas; Ruth Bader Ginsburg · Stephen Breyer

Case opinions
- Majority: Rehnquist, joined by O'Connor, Scalia, Kennedy, Thomas
- Dissent: Stevens, joined by Souter, Ginsburg, Breyer

Laws applied
- Patent Clause, Commerce Clause, U.S. Const. amend. XI, U.S. Const. amend. XIV

Florida Prepaid Postsecondary Education Expense Board v. College Savings Bank, 527 U.S. 627 (1999), was a decision by the Supreme Court of the United States relating to the doctrine of sovereign immunity.

Florida Prepaid was a companion case to the similarly named (but not to be confused) College Savings Bank v. Florida Prepaid Postsecondary Education Expense Board, 527 U.S. 666 (1999). Where College Savings Bank was an action brought under the Lanham Act, Florida Prepaid was a concurrent action brought under the Patent and Plant Variety Protection Remedy Clarification Act. Although it was unnecessary to reach the question of whether Congress had validly abrogated Florida's sovereign immunity in College Savings Bank, the question was unavoidable in Florida Prepaid.

== Findings ==
In a 5–4 decision authored by Chief Justice William Rehnquist, the court held that the Act's abrogation of States' sovereign immunity was invalid. Congress could only abrogate sovereign immunity pursuant to its powers under § 5 of the Fourteenth Amendment and not Article I (see Fitzpatrick v. Bitzer; Seminole Tribe of Florida v. Florida). Applying the § 5 test provided in City of Boerne v. Flores, the validity of the Act could not be sustained.

== Implications ==
The results of the case are cited repeatedly in subsequent patent cases, and criticized.

Justice Stephen Breyer, in Active Liberty (Federalism), mentions the case as example of potentially overreaching or counterproductive restriction of federal authority to "create uniform individual remedies under legislation dealing with nationwide problems—for example, private civil damages actions for citizens injured by a state's unlawful use of their intellectual property."

== See also ==
- List of United States Supreme Court cases, volume 527
- List of United States Supreme Court cases
- Lists of United States Supreme Court cases by volume
