= College Savings Bank v. Florida Prepaid Postsecondary Education Expense Board =

- Supreme Court of the United States

Argued April 20, 1999 Decided June 23, 1999
- Full case name: College Savings Bank, Petitioner, v. Florida Prepaid Postsecondary Education Expense Board
- Citations: 527 U.S. 666 (more) 119 S. Ct. 2219; 144 L. Ed. 2d 605; 51 U.S.P.Q.2d 1065

Case history
- Prior: 948 F. Supp. 400 (D.N.J. 1996), aff'd, 131 F.3d 353 (3d Cir. 1997), cert. granted, 525 U.S. 1063 (1999).

Holding
- Dismissed for lack of jurisdiction because the Trademark Remedy Clarification Act did not abrogate state sovereign immunity for the purposes of this case, the state did not expressly waive sovereign immunity, and the doctrine of constructive waiver is no longer good law.

Court membership
- Chief Justice William Rehnquist Associate Justices John P. Stevens · Sandra Day O'Connor; Antonin Scalia · Anthony Kennedy; David Souter · Clarence Thomas; Ruth Bader Ginsburg · Stephen Breyer

Case opinions
- Majority: Scalia, joined by Rehnquist, O'Connor, Kennedy, Thomas
- Dissent: Stevens
- Dissent: Breyer, joined by Stevens, Souter, Ginsburg

Laws applied
- Lanham Act; Trademark Remedy Clarification Act
- This case overturned a previous ruling or rulings
- Parden v. Terminal R.R. Co. of Ala. Docks Dep't, 377 U.S. 184 (1964)

College Savings Bank v. Florida Prepaid Postsecondary Education Expense Board, 527 U.S. 666 (1999), was a decision by the Supreme Court of the United States relating to the doctrine of sovereign immunity.

== Opinion of the Court ==
A companion case to the similarly named (but not to be confused) Florida Prepaid Postsecondary Education Expense Board v. College Savings Bank, the court held – in a decision authored by Justice Antonin Scalia – that sovereign immunity precluded a private action brought under the Lanham Act. For such an action to be sustained, the Court explained, the state must either consent to the suit, or have had its sovereign immunity waived by Congress:

- The abrogation exception did not apply, because the U.S. Congress can only waive sovereign immunity pursuant to the power granted by § 5 of the Fourteenth Amendment (see Fitzpatrick v. Bitzer; Seminole Tribe v. Florida), and both the Lanham Act and the Trademark Remedy Clarification Act were enacted pursuant to Congress' Article I powers. Moreover, § 5's "term 'enforce' is to be taken seriously—that the object of valid § 5 legislation must be the carefully delimited remediation or prevention of constitutional violations," College Savings Bank at __, and because the asserted property right in question was not in fact a property right ("The hallmark of a protected property interest is the right to exclude others ... [but] [t]he Lanham Act's false-advertising provisions ... bear no relationship to any right to exclude; and Florida Prepaid's alleged misrepresentations concerning its own products intruded upon no interest over which petitioner had exclusive dominion") (id. at __), and so the court declined to "pursue the follow-on question that City of Boerne v. Flores would otherwise require us to resolve: whether the prophylactic measure taken under purported authority of § 5 (viz., prohibition of States' sovereign-immunity claims, which are not in themselves a violation of the Fourteenth Amendment) was genuinely necessary to prevent violation of the Fourteenth Amendment." Id. at __.
- There was no suggestion that Florida expressly consented to suit, and what was instead asserted was the concept of constructive waiver – the premise that merely by engaging in an activity regulated by Congress, the state waives its immunity. This concept sprang from a single case in the Court's jurisprudence, Parden v. Terminal R.R. Co. of Ala. Docks Dep't, 377 U.S. 184 (1964). But the court characterized Parden as "elliptical," "an anomaly in the jurisprudence of sovereign immunity, and indeed in the jurisprudence of constitutional law," and noted that within ten years of Parden, the court was in headlong retreat from it, saying that there was "'no place' for the doctrine of constructive waiver in our sovereign-immunity jurisprudence, and we emphasized that we would "find waiver only where stated by the most express language or by such overwhelming implications from the text as [will] leave no room for any other reasonable construction." College Savings Bank at __. Parden, the Court observed, "broke sharply with prior cases, and is fundamentally incompatible with later ones. We have never applied the holding of Parden to another statute, and in fact have narrowed the case in every subsequent opinion in which it has been under consideration." The Court expressly overruled "Whatever may remain" of the decision after its narrowing by intervening cases.

== See also ==
- List of United States Supreme Court cases, volume 527
- List of United States Supreme Court cases
- Lists of United States Supreme Court cases by volume
