= Judiciary Act of 1789 =

US law establishing federal court system

- Long title: An Act to establish the Judicial Courts of the United States
- Nicknames: Establishment of the federal judiciary
- Enacted by: the 1st United States Congress

Citations
- Statutes at Large: 1 Stat. 73

Legislative history
- Introduced in the Senate as the Judiciary Act by Richard Henry Lee on June 12, 1789; Passed the Senate on July 17, 1789 (14–6); Passed the House of Representatives on September 17, 1789 (37–16) with amendment; Senate agreed to House of Representatives amendment on September 19, 1789 () with further amendment; House agreed to Senate amendment on September 21, 1789 (); Signed into law by President George Washington on September 24, 1789

Major amendments
- Judiciary Act of 1801, 1802, 1866, 1867, 1869, 1891, 1925; U.S. Const. amend. XI

United States Supreme Court cases
- Marbury v. Madison, 5 U.S. 137 (1803); Grupo Mexicano de Desarrollo, S.A. v. Alliance Bond Fund, Inc., 527 U.S. 308 (1999); Trump v. CASA, 606 U.S. 831 (2025)

The Judiciary Act of 1789 (ch. 20, 1 Stat. 73) is a United States federal statute enacted on September 24, 1789, during the first session of the First United States Congress. It established the federal judiciary of the United States. Article III, Section 1 of the Constitution prescribed that the "judicial power of the United States, shall be vested in one Supreme Court, and such inferior Courts" as Congress saw fit to establish. It made no provision for the composition or procedures of any of the courts, leaving this to Congress to decide.

The existence of a separate federal judiciary was controversial during the debates over the ratification of the Constitution. Anti-Federalists had denounced the judicial power as a potential instrument of national tyranny. Indeed, of the ten amendments that eventually became the Bill of Rights, five (the fourth through the eighth) dealt primarily with judicial proceedings. Even after ratification, some opponents of a strong judiciary urged that the federal court system be limited to only a Supreme Court and, perhaps, local admiralty judges. Congress, however, decided to establish a system of federal trial courts with broader jurisdiction, thereby creating an arm for enforcement of national laws within each state.

== Legislative history ==
Senator Richard Henry Lee (AA-Virginia) reported the judiciary bill out of committee on June 12, 1789; Oliver Ellsworth of Connecticut, who would go on to serve as the third Chief Justice of the United States, was its chief author. The bill passed the Senate 14–6 on July 17, 1789, and the House of Representatives then debated the bill in July and August 1789. The House passed an amended bill 37–16 on September 17, 1789. The Senate struck four of the House amendments and approved the remaining provisions on September 19, 1789. The House passed the Senate's final version of the bill on September 21, 1789. U.S. president George Washington signed the act into law on September 24, 1789.

== Provisions of the act ==
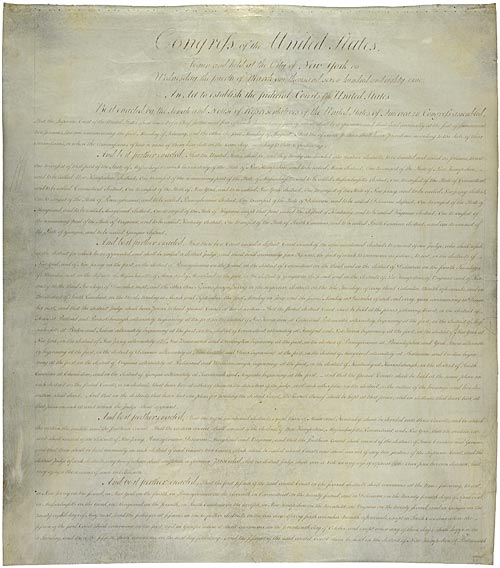
The first page of the Judiciary Act of 1789

The act set the number of Supreme Court justices at six: one chief justice and five associate justices. The Supreme Court was given exclusive original jurisdiction over all civil actions between states, or between a state and the United States, as well as over all suits and proceedings brought against ambassadors and other diplomatic personnel; and original, but not exclusive, jurisdiction over all other cases in which a state was a party and any cases brought by an ambassador. The Court was given appellate jurisdiction over decisions of the federal circuit courts as well as decisions by state courts holding invalid any statute or treaty of the United States; or holding valid any state law or practice that was challenged as being inconsistent with the federal constitution, treaties, or laws; or rejecting any claim made by a party under a provision of the federal constitution, treaties, or laws.

SECTION 1. Be it enacted by the Senate and House of Representatives of the United States of America in Congress assembled, That the supreme court of the United States shall consist of a chief justice and five associate justices, any four of whom shall be a quorum, and shall hold annually at the seat of government two sessions, the one commencing the first Monday of February, and the other the first Monday of August. [bold added]

— Judiciary Act of 1789

The act also created 13 judicial districts within the 11 states that had then ratified the Constitution (North Carolina and Rhode Island were added as judicial districts in 1790, and other states as they were admitted to the Union). Each state comprised one district, except for Virginia and Massachusetts, each of which comprised two. Massachusetts was divided into the District of Maine (which was then part of Massachusetts) and the District of Massachusetts (which covered modern-day Massachusetts). Virginia was divided into the District of Kentucky (which was then part of Virginia) and the District of Virginia (which covered modern-day West Virginia and Virginia).

This act established a circuit court and district court in each judicial district (except in Maine and Kentucky, where the district courts exercised much of the jurisdiction of the circuit courts). The circuit courts, which comprised a district judge and (initially) two Supreme Court justices "riding circuit", had original jurisdiction over serious crimes and civil cases of at least $500 involving diversity jurisdiction or the United States as plaintiff in common law and equity. The circuit courts also had appellate jurisdiction over the district courts. The single-judge district courts had jurisdiction primarily over admiralty cases, petty crimes, and suits by the United States for at least $100. Notably, at this time, Congress did not grant original federal question jurisdiction to the federal courts, which is why diversity has been described as the "original" and "ancient" jurisdiction of the federal courts.

Congress authorized persons who were sued by citizens of another state, in the courts of the plaintiff's home state, to remove the lawsuit to the federal circuit court. According to Edward A. Purcell Jr., removal was the "most significant innovation" of the Act. The Constitution says nothing about removal jurisdiction, which "was a powerful device to assert the primacy of the national judicial power over that of the states."

The act created the Office of Attorney General, whose primary responsibility was to represent the United States before the Supreme Court. The act also created a United States attorney and a United States marshal for each judicial district.

The Judiciary Act of 1789 included the Alien Tort Statute, now codified as 28 U.S.C. § 1350, which provides jurisdiction in the district courts over lawsuits by aliens for torts in violation of the law of nations or treaties of the United States.

== Implementation ==
Immediately after signing the Judiciary Act into law, President Washington submitted his nominations to fill the offices created by the act. Among the nominees were John Jay for Chief Justice of the United States; John Rutledge, William Cushing, Robert H. Harrison, James Wilson, and John Blair Jr. as associate justices; Edmund Randolph for Attorney General; and myriad district judges, United States attorneys, and United States marshals for Connecticut, Delaware, Georgia, Kentucky, Maryland, Maine, Massachusetts, New Hampshire, New Jersey, New York, Pennsylvania, South Carolina, and Virginia. All six of Washington's Supreme Court nominees were confirmed by the Senate. Harrison, however, declined to serve. In his place, Washington later nominated James Iredell, who joined the Court in 1790, thereby bringing the Court to its "full strength" complement of six members.

The first six persons to serve on the United States Supreme Court (ordered by seniority) were:

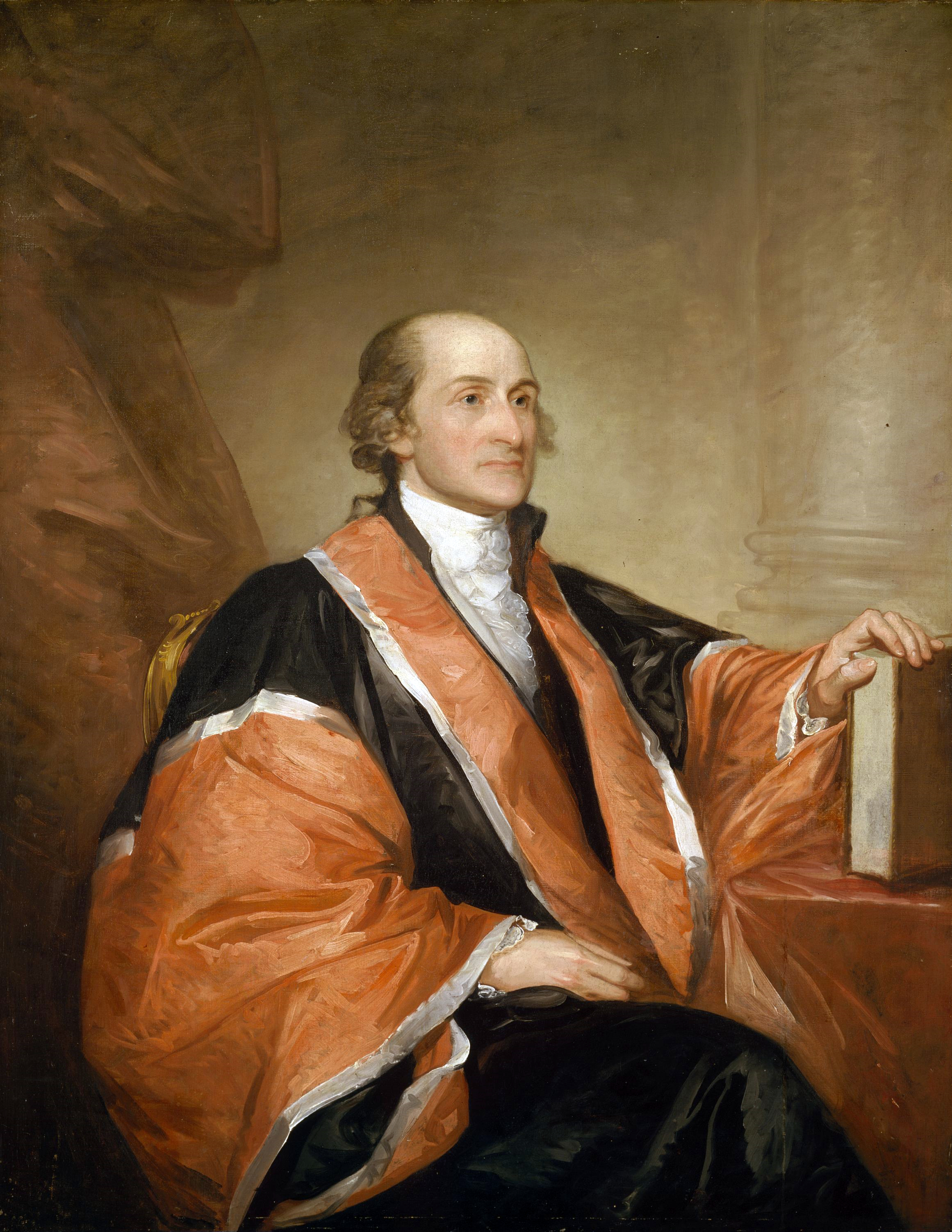
John Jay
Chief Justice
Commissioned: September 26, 1789

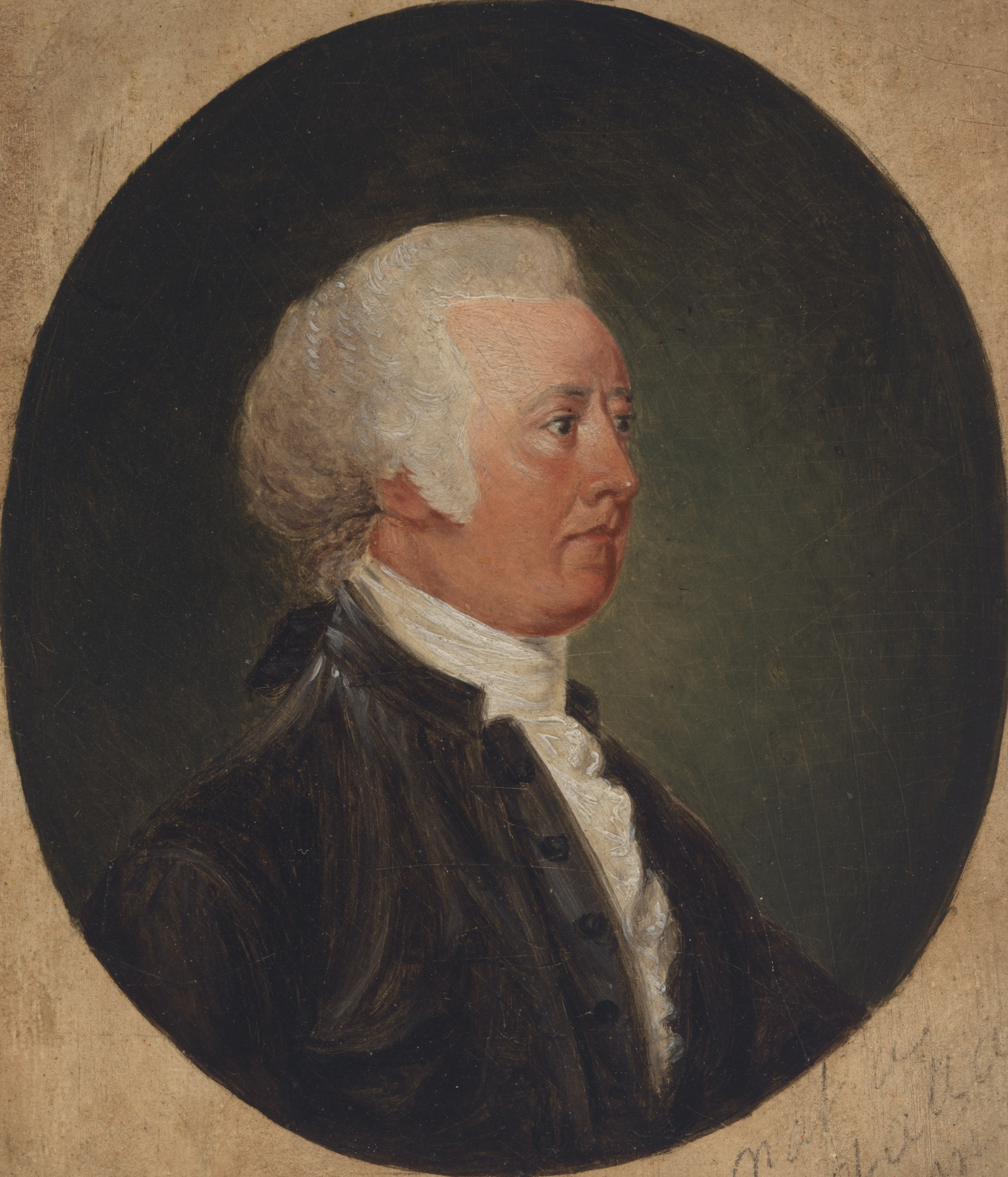
John Rutledge
Associate Justice
Commissioned: September 26, 1789

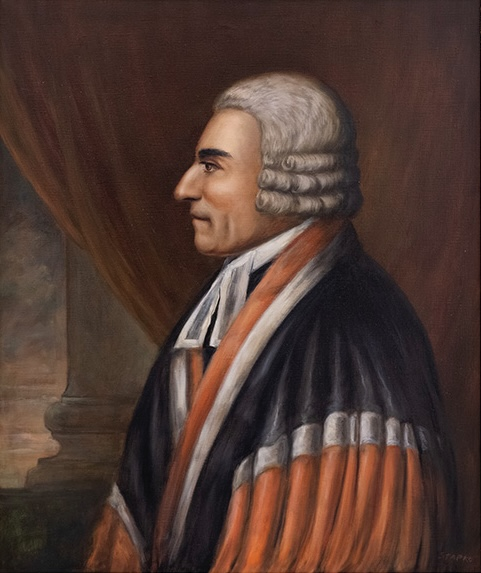
William Cushing
Associate Justice
Commissioned: September 27, 1789

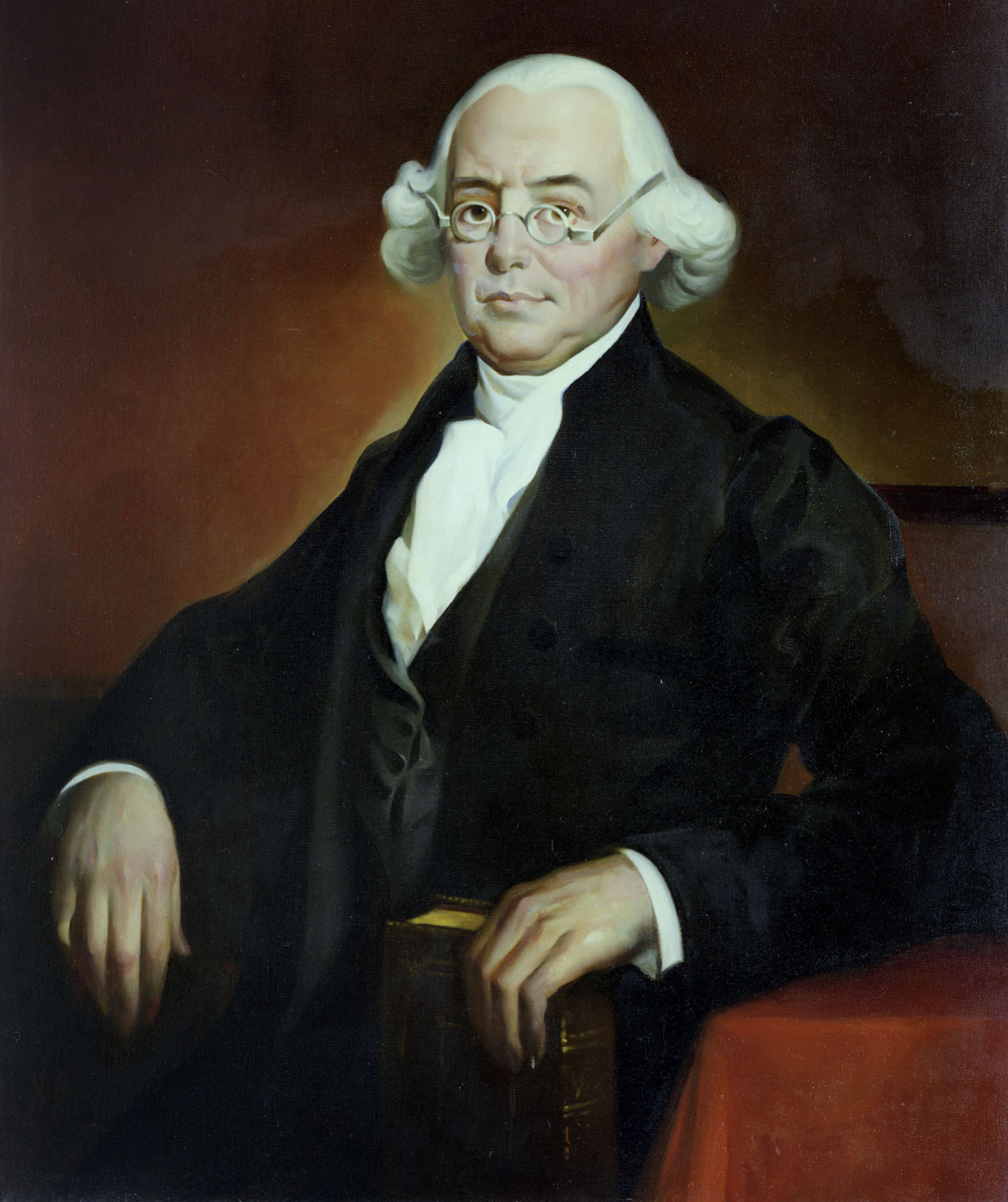
James Wilson
Associate Justice
Commissioned: September. 29, 1789

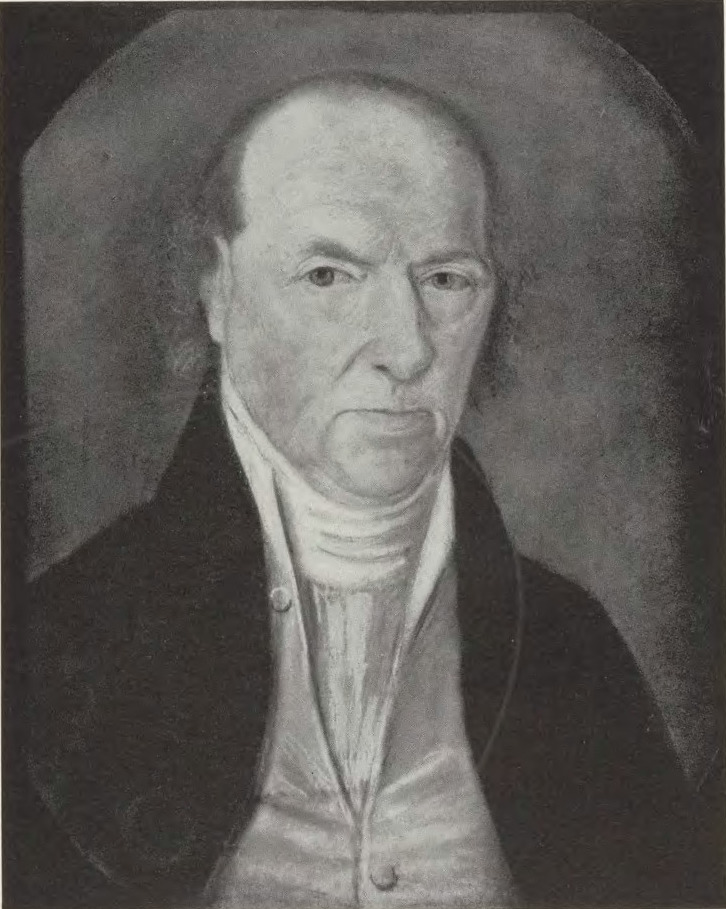
John Blair
Associate Justice
Commissioned: September 30, 1789

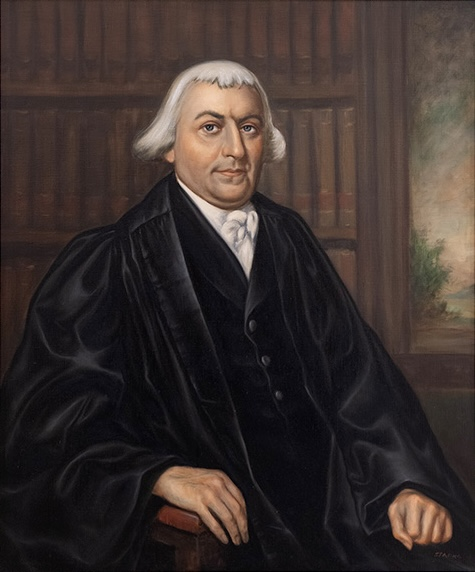
James Iredell
Associate Justice
Commissioned: February 10, 1790

The seniority of the associate justices was set by § 1 of the Judiciary Act of 1789, which assigned seniority by the dates borne on the judicial commissions each justice received from President Washington prior to taking office. This rule setting seniority of the justices is today codified at Title 28 U.S.C. § 4.

== Judicial review ==
A clause in Section 13 of the Judiciary Act, which granted the Supreme Court the power to issue writs of mandamus under its original jurisdiction, was later declared unconstitutional. In Marbury v. Madison, one of the seminal cases in American law, the Supreme Court held that it was unconstitutional because it purported to enlarge the original jurisdiction of the Supreme Court beyond that permitted by the Constitution. The case was the first that clearly established that the judiciary can and must interpret what the Constitution permits and declare any laws which are contrary to the Constitution as unenforceable. Thus, the Judiciary Act of 1789 was the first act of Congress to be partially invalidated by the Supreme Court.

== See also ==
- List of courts of the United States
- List of federal judges appointed by George Washington
- Supreme Court reform in the United States
- United States Constitution
