= Active Liberty =

2005 book by Stephen Breyer

Active Liberty: Interpreting Our Democratic Constitution
- Active Liberty cover
- Author: Stephen Breyer
- Language: English
- Publisher: Vintage Books
- Publication date: October 17, 2005
- Publication place: United States
- Media type: Print (Hardcover)
- Pages: 161
- ISBN: 0-307-26313-4
- OCLC: 59280151
- Preceded by: Breaking the Vicious Cycle: Toward Effective Risk Regulation (1994)
- Followed by: Administrative Law and Regulatory Policy: Problems, Text, and Cases (2006)

Active Liberty: Interpreting Our Democratic Constitution is a 2005 book by United States Supreme Court Justice Stephen Breyer. The general theme of the book is that Supreme Court justices should, when dealing with constitutional issues, keep "active liberty" in mind, which Justice Breyer defines as the right of the citizenry of the country to participate in government. Breyer's thesis is commonly viewed as a liberal response to originalism, a view espoused by Justice Antonin Scalia.

== Background ==
Active Liberty is based on the Tanner Lectures on Human Values that Breyer delivered at Harvard University in November 2004.

== Reception ==
In a review of Active Liberty, Pierre Rosanvallon said that Breyer's arguments are convincing but they would be benefit from being "more firmly grounded if he had also touched on the Constitution's textual vagueness". Richard A. Posner of the University of Chicago Law School negatively reviewed the book, stating that, despite the merits of the book as a short and accessible but influential contribution to constitutional debate, is it not convincing to him.

Political scientist Kenneth I. Kersch framed Breyer as drawing from Hart and Sachs' The Legal Process textbook. Noting that this textbook was never published for use beyond Harvard Law School because its authors were unable to integrate Brown v. Board of Education (1954) with their framework of judicial pragmatism, Kersch argued that Breyer's emphasis on active liberty would similarly be unfit for difficult constitutional questions.
