= Kenneth I. Kersch =

American political scientist

Ken Kersch
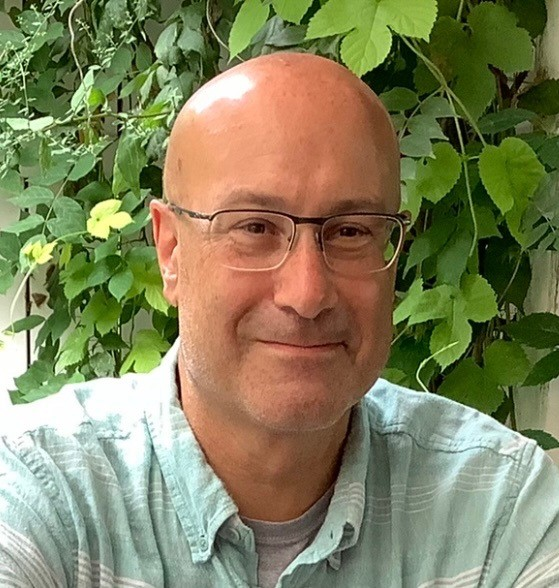
- Born: August 13, 1964; Bay Shore, New York
- Died: November 27, 2024 (age 60); Boston, Massachusetts
- Awards: Edward S. Corwin Award; J. David Greenstone Prize; Hughes-Gossett Award; C. Herman Pritchett Award

Academic background
- Education: Williams College (BA); Northwestern University (JD); Cornell University (PhD)

Academic work
- Discipline: Political Science
- Sub-discipline: Judicial interpretation
- Institutions: Lehigh University; Princeton University; Boston College

Kenneth Ira Kersch (August 13, 1964 – November 27, 2024) was an American political scientist and legal scholar. He was the founding director of Boston College's Clough Center for the Study of Constitutional Democracy and achieved accolades for his writings on American politics and the constitution.

== Early life ==
Kersch was born in the Bay Shore hamlet on Long Island, New York on August 13, 1964 and graduated from East Islip High School in 1982. He attended Williams College for his Bachelor's degree, studied abroad at the Paris-Sorbonne University, and graduated magna cum laude from Williams in 1986. Following his graduation, Kersch worked as a Legal Assistant in New York City and on the 1988 presidential campaign for Bruce Babbitt.

Kersch would later get a Juris Doctor from Northwestern University, graduating cum laude and with the Order of the Coif, and earned a PhD in Government from Cornell University. He was admitted to the bar in New York, Massachusetts, and the District of Columbia.

Kersch died from cancer on November 27, 2024 at the age of 60.

== Academic career ==
Kersch began his teaching career as a professor of political science at Lehigh University before teaching at Princeton University as an assistant professor. He moved to Boston College in 2007, where he was the founder of the Clough Center for the Study of Constitutional Democracy in 2008 as its director. During his tenure at Boston College, Kersh would be a visiting professor at Harvard University, a Tallman Scholar at Bowdoin College, and a Distinguished Research Fellow at the University of Missouri Kinder Institute on Constitutional Democracy.

=== Writings ===
Kersch published a number of articles and books on American political and constitutional development, focusing on conservative views of the constitution. He won a number of awards for his writings, most notably from the American Political Science Association and the Supreme Court Historical Society.

In 2000, Kersch won the APSA's Edward S. Corwin Award for the best doctoral dissertation in the field of public law for his dissertation, "Frames of Progress: The Political Imagination of Rights and Liberties in the United States Supreme Court."

Constructing Civil Liberties: Discontinuities in the Development of American Constitutional Law, stemming from his dissertation, detailed how the growth of jurisprudence on constitutional civil liberties relating to the New Deal was able to strengthen the growth and legitimization of the country. This work earned him APSA's the J. David Greenstone Prize for the best book in history and politics in 2006.

Kersch also receive the Hughes-Gossett Award from the Supreme Court Historical Society for his article, “The Gompers v. Bucks Stove Saga: A Constitutional Case Study in Dialogue, Resistance, and the Freedom of Speech," which was published in the Journal of Supreme Court History in 2006.

His next book, Conservatives and the Constitution: Imagining Constitutional Restoration in the Heyday of American Liberalism, describes a challenge to the belief that constitutional conservatism that stemmed from Ronald Reagan's presidency has always been the same. Rather than being strictly originalist and anti-living constitution, Kersch argues that constitutional interpretation by pre-Reagan conservative academics had conflicting views influenced by differing schools of thought, which were dominated by a focus on conservative values rather than neutral legal theories. In 2020, Kersch received the APSA's C. Herman Pritchett Award for the best book on law and courts by a political scientist.

Following Kersch's passing, a symposium was held in his honor to discuss the influence of his work.
