= List of United States Supreme Court cases, volume 527 =

This is a list of all the United States Supreme Court cases from volume 527 of the United States Reports:

Case name	Citation	Date decided
Neder v. United States	527 U.S. 1	June 10, 1999
Chicago v. Morales	527 U.S. 41	1999
Lilly v. Virginia	527 U.S. 116	1999
Dickinson v. Zurko	527 U.S. 150	1999
Greater New Orleans Broadcasting Assn., Inc. v. United States	527 U.S. 173	1999
Cunningham v. Hamilton County	527 U.S. 198	1999
West v. Gibson	527 U.S. 212	1999
NASA v. FLRA	527 U.S. 229	1999
A NASA-OIG investigator is a "representative" of NASA when conducting an employee examination covered by § 7114(a)(2)(B) of the Federal Service Labor-Management Relations Statute.
Strickler v. Greene	527 U.S. 263	1999
Grupo Mexicano de Desarrollo, S. A. v. Alliance Bond Fund, Inc.	527 U.S. 308	1999
Martin v. Hadix	527 U.S. 343	1999
Jones v. United States	527 U.S. 373	1999
Jefferson County v. Acker	527 U.S. 423	1999
Maryland v. Dyson	527 U.S. 465	1999
Fertel-Rust v. Milwaukee County Mental Health Center	527 U.S. 469	1999
Sutton v. United Air Lines, Inc.	527 U.S. 471	1999
Murphy v. United Parcel Service, Inc.	527 U.S. 516	1999
Kolstad v. American Dental Assn.	527 U.S. 526	1999
Albertsons, Inc. v. Kirkingburg	527 U.S. 555	1999
Olmstead v. L. C.	527 U.S. 581	1999
Florida Prepaid Postsecondary Ed. Expense Bd. v. College Savings Bank	527 U.S. 627	1999
College Savings Bank v. Florida Prepaid Postsecondary Ed. Expense Bd.	527 U.S. 666	1999
Alden v. Maine	527 U.S. 706	1999
Ortiz v. Fibreboard Corp.	527 U.S. 815	1999
Whitfield v. Texas	527 U.S. 885	1999
