= Stephen Breyer =

US Supreme Court justice from 1994 to 2022

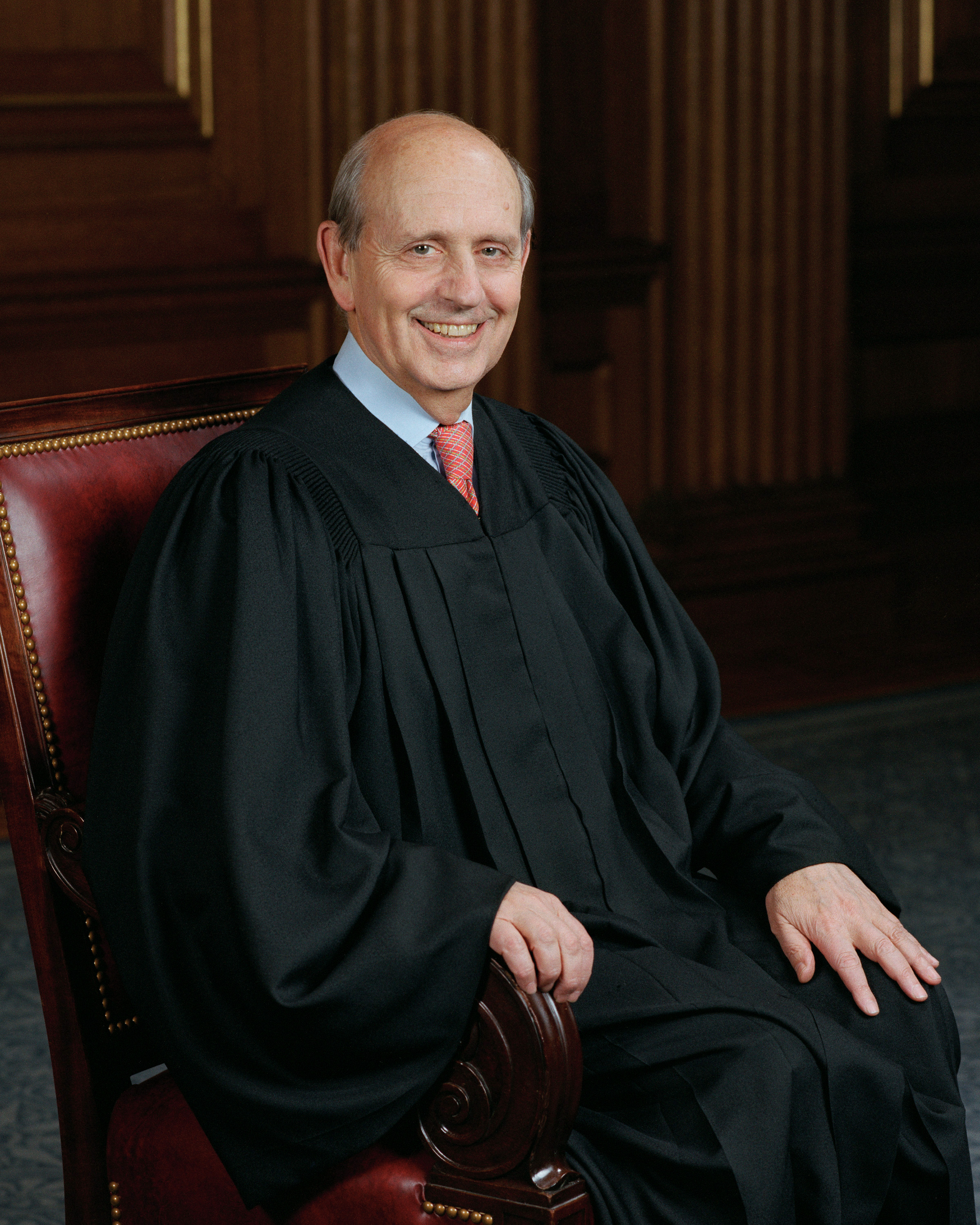
- Official portrait, c. 2006

Associate Justice of the Supreme Court of the United States
- In office August 3, 1994 – June 30, 2022
- Nominated by: Bill Clinton
- Preceded by: Harry Blackmun
- Succeeded by: Ketanji Brown Jackson

Chief Judge of the United States Court of Appeals for the First Circuit
- In office March 1990 – August 3, 1994
- Preceded by: Levin H. Campbell
- Succeeded by: Juan R. Torruella

Judge of the United States Court of Appeals for the First Circuit
- In office December 10, 1980 – August 3, 1994
- Nominated by: Jimmy Carter
- Preceded by: Seat established
- Succeeded by: Sandra Lynch

Personal details
- Born: Stephen Gerald Breyer; August 15, 1938 (age 88) San Francisco, California, U.S.
- Party: Democratic
- Spouse: Joanna Hare (m. 1967)
- Children: 3
- Relatives: Charles Breyer (brother)
- Education: Stanford University (BA); Magdalen College, Oxford (BA); Harvard University (LLB)

Military service
- Branch/service: United States Army; U.S. Army Reserve
- Years of service: 1957–1965
- Rank: Corporal
- Unit: Army Strategic Intelligence
- Battles/wars: Vietnam War
- Breyer's voice Breyer delivering the decision of Washington State Dept. of Licensing v. Cougar Den, Inc. Recorded March 19, 2019

Stephen Gerald Breyer (/ˈbraɪ.ər/, BRY-ər; born August 15, 1938) is an American lawyer and jurist who served as an associate justice of the U.S. Supreme Court from 1994 until his retirement in 2022. He was nominated by President Bill Clinton, and replaced retiring justice Harry Blackmun. Breyer was generally associated with the liberal wing of the Court. Since his retirement, he has been the Byrne Professor of Administrative Law and Process at Harvard Law School.

Born in San Francisco, Breyer attended Stanford University and the University of Oxford, and graduated from Harvard Law School in 1964. After a clerkship with Associate Justice Arthur Goldberg in 1964–65, Breyer was a law professor and lecturer at Harvard Law School from 1967 until 1980. He specialized in administrative law, writing textbooks that remain in use today. He held other prominent positions before being nominated to the Supreme Court, including special assistant to the United States assistant attorney general for antitrust and assistant special prosecutor on the Watergate Special Prosecution Force in 1973. Breyer became a federal judge in 1980, when he was appointed to the U.S. Court of Appeals for the First Circuit. In his 2005 book Active Liberty, Breyer made his first attempt to systematically communicate his views on legal theory, arguing that the judiciary should seek to resolve issues in a manner that encourages popular participation in governmental decisions.

On January 27, 2022, Breyer and President Joe Biden announced Breyer's intention to retire from the Supreme Court. On February 25, 2022, Biden nominated Ketanji Brown Jackson, a judge on the U.S. Court of Appeals for the District of Columbia Circuit and one of Breyer's former law clerks, to succeed him. Breyer remained on the Supreme Court until June 30, 2022, when Jackson succeeded him. Breyer wrote majority opinions in landmark Supreme Court cases such as Mahanoy Area School District v. B.L., United States v. Lara, and Google v. Oracle and notable dissents questioning the constitutionality of the death penalty in cases such as Glossip v. Gross.

== Early life and education ==
Breyer was born on August 15, 1938, in San Francisco, California, to Anne A. (née Roberts) and Irving Gerald Breyer. Breyer's paternal great-grandfather emigrated from Romania to the United States, settling in Cleveland, Ohio, where Breyer's grandfather was born. Breyer was raised in a middle-class Reform Jewish family. His father was a lawyer who served as legal counsel to the San Francisco Board of Education.

Breyer and his younger brother Charles Breyer, who later became a federal district judge, were active in the Boy Scouts of America and achieved the Eagle Scout rank. In 2007, he received the Distinguished Eagle Scout Award. Breyer attended Lowell High School, where he was a member of the Lowell Forensic Society and debated regularly in high school tournaments, including against future California governor Jerry Brown and future Harvard Law School professor Laurence Tribe.

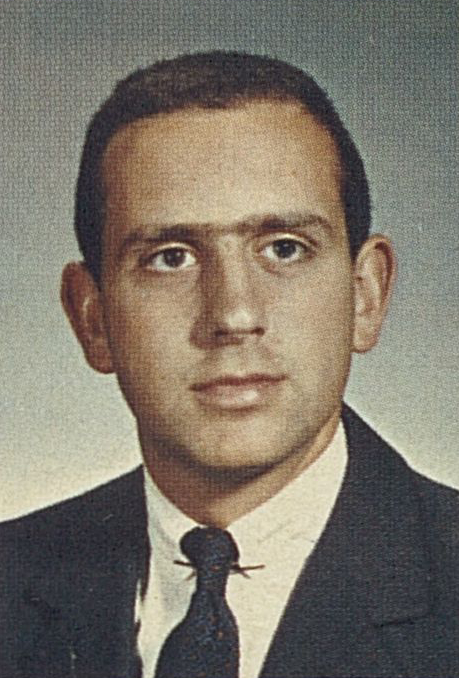
Breyer in the Stanford University yearbook, 1959

After graduating from high school in 1955, Breyer studied philosophy at Stanford University. He graduated in 1959 with a Bachelor of Arts degree with highest honors and membership in Phi Beta Kappa. Breyer was awarded a Marshall Scholarship, which he used to study philosophy, politics, and economics at Magdalen College, Oxford, receiving a B.A. with first-class honors in 1961. He then returned to the United States to attend Harvard Law School, where he was an articles editor of the Harvard Law Review and graduated in 1964 with a Bachelor of Laws degree, magna cum laude.

Breyer spent eight years in the United States Army Reserve during the Vietnam War, including six months on active duty in the Army Strategic Intelligence. He reached the rank of corporal and was honorably discharged in 1965.

In 1967, Breyer married Joanna Freda Hare, a psychologist and member of the British aristocracy, younger daughter of John Hare, 1st Viscount Blakenham and granddaughter of Richard Hare, 4th Earl of Listowel. They have three adult children: Chloe, an Episcopal priest; Nell; and Michael.

== Legal career ==
After law school, Breyer served as a law clerk to U.S. Supreme Court justice Arthur Goldberg from 1964 to 1965. During his clerkship, Breyer wrote the first draft of Goldberg's concurrence in Griswold v. Connecticut (1965), which argued that the right to privacy could be derived from the Ninth Amendment. Breyer served briefly as a fact-checker for the Warren Commission, followed by two years in the U.S. Department of Justice's Antitrust Division as a special assistant to its assistant attorney general.

In 1967, Breyer returned to Harvard Law School as an assistant professor. He taught at Harvard Law until 1980, and he held a joint appointment at Harvard Kennedy School from 1977 to 1980. At Harvard, Breyer was known as a leading expert on administrative law. While there, he wrote two highly influential books on deregulation: Breaking the Vicious Circle: Toward Effective Risk Regulation and Regulation and Its Reform. In 1970, economist Ben Kaplan spurred Breyer to write "The Uneasy Case for Copyright", one of the most widely cited skeptical examinations of copyright. In 1979, Breyer co-wrote Administrative Law and Regulatory Policy with Richard Stewart. Breyer was a visiting professor at the College of Law in Sydney, Australia; the University of Rome; and Tulane University Law School.

While teaching at Harvard, Breyer took several leaves of absence to serve in the U.S. government. He served as an assistant special prosecutor on the Watergate Special Prosecution Force in 1973. Breyer was a special counsel to the U.S. Senate Committee on the Judiciary from 1974 to 1975 and served as chief counsel of the committee from 1979 to 1980. He worked closely with the chairman of the committee, Senator Edward M. Kennedy, to pass the Airline Deregulation Act that closed the Civil Aeronautics Board.

== U.S. Court of Appeals (1980–1994) ==
On November 13, 1980, President Jimmy Carter nominated Breyer to the First Circuit, to a new seat established by 92 Stat. 1629, and the United States Senate confirmed him on December 9 by an 80–10 vote. Breyer received his commission on December 10, 1980. From 1980 to 1994, he was a judge on the U.S. Court of Appeals for the First Circuit; he was the court's chief judge from 1990 to 1994. One of Breyer's duties as chief judge was to oversee the design and construction of a new federal courthouse for Boston, beginning an avocational interest in architecture. In 2018, he was named to chair the Pritzker Architecture Prize jury, succeeding Glenn Murcutt.

Many of Breyer's First Circuit decisions followed principles expressed in Goldberg's opinions, though some were reversed on appeal by an increasingly conservative Supreme Court. During Breyer's Supreme Court confirmation hearings, Ohio Senator Howard Metzenbaum criticized him for never voting in favor of an antitrust claim while on the First Circuit.

Breyer served as a member of the Judicial Conference of the United States between 1990 and 1994 and the United States Sentencing Commission between 1985 and 1989. In the latter role, he oversaw the initial Federal Sentencing Guidelines, which sought uniformity in sentencing. Breyer successfully opposed a Republican proposal to include the death penalty as mandatory punishment for some crimes.

== Supreme Court (1994–2022) ==
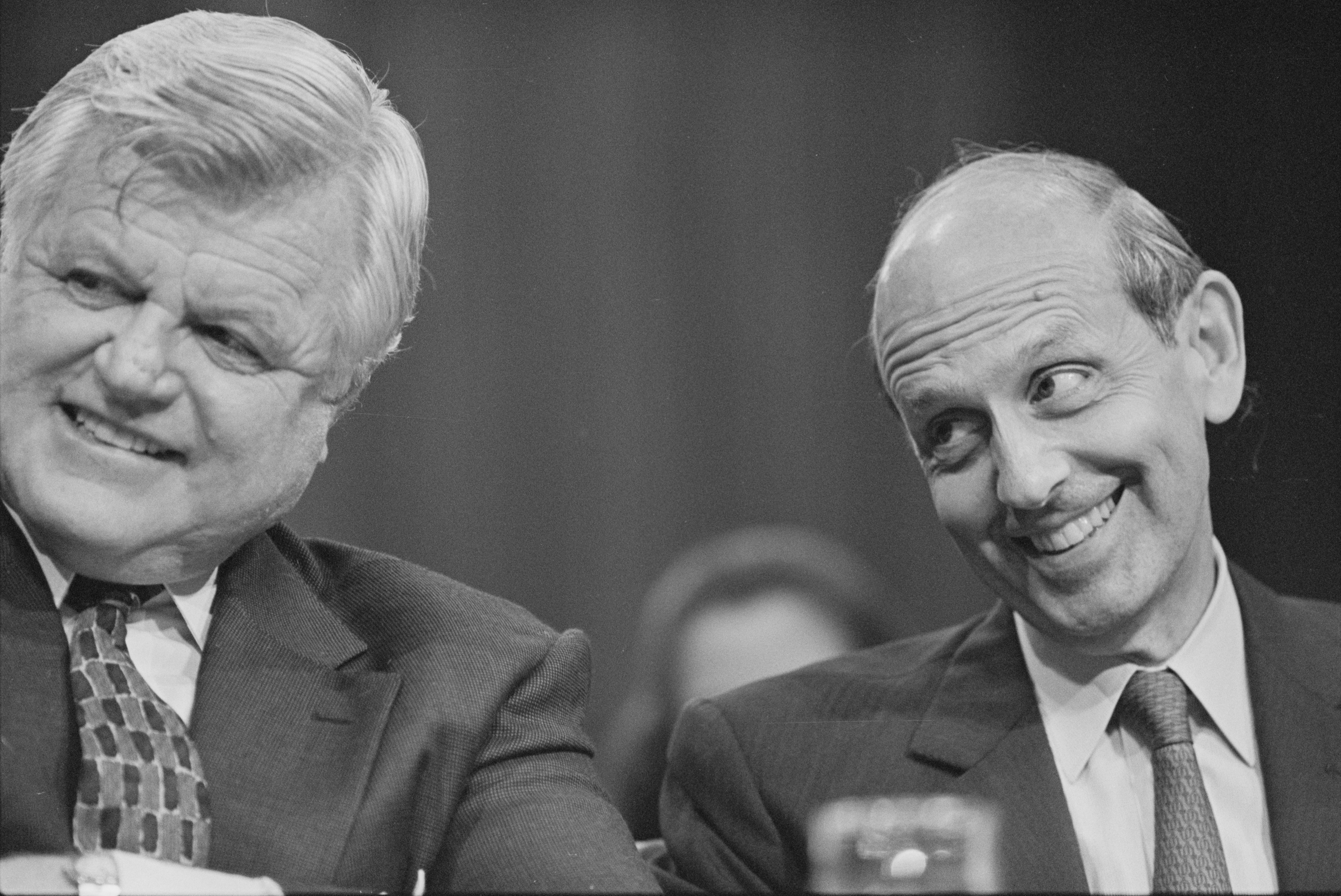
Breyer (right) with Ted Kennedy at his Supreme Court confirmation hearing

In 1993, on the recommendation of Orrin Hatch, President Bill Clinton considered both Breyer and Ruth Bader Ginsburg for the seat vacated by Byron White. Clinton ultimately appointed Ginsburg, fearing that Breyer's focus on administrative law would lead to conservative rulings.

After Harry Blackmun retired in 1994, Clinton initially offered the nomination to George Mitchell, the Senate Majority Leader, but Mitchell declined in order to make a final attempt to pass the Clinton health care plan. U.S. Secretary of the Interior Bruce Babbitt also declined to avoid compelling his wife, Harriet C. Babbitt, to resign as U.S. Ambassador to the Organization of American States. Clinton next turned to Richard S. Arnold, then serving as chief judge of the U.S. Court of Appeals for the Eighth Circuit, as Arnold had also been considered to replace White. But Arnold withdrew himself the day before the planned announcement because his doctors concluded that his recurrent cancer might lead to an early death.

Breyer was nominated on May 17, 1994, after heavy lobbying by Senator Ted Kennedy. Benefiting from bipartisan recognition of his work for the Senate Judiciary Committee, he was confirmed on July 29 by an 87 to 9 vote. Breyer wrote 551 opinions during his 28-year career, not counting those relating to orders or in the "shadow docket". For his first 11 years, the composition of the Court remained unchanged, the longest such stretch in over 180 years. Since the most senior member of the majority chooses its writer, Breyer generally did not produce high-profile majority opinions during the first half of his tenure. In recognition of his service, he was inducted into the American Philosophical Society in 2004.

In 2015, Breyer broke a federal law that bans judges from hearing cases when they or their spouses or minor children have a financial interest in a company involved. His wife sold about $33,000 worth of stock in Johnson Controls a day after Breyer participated in the oral argument. This brought him back into compliance and he joined the majority in ruling in favor of the interests of a Johnson Controls subsidiary which was party to FERC v. Electric Power Supply Ass'n.

=== Abortion ===
An "unequivocal defender of abortion rights", Breyer wrote for the majority in Stenberg v. Carhart (2000) to strike down a Nebraska ban on partial-birth abortion and dissented in Gonzales v. Carhart (2007), which upheld a federal ban. In Whole Woman's Health v. Hellerstedt (2016) and June Medical Services, LLC v. Russo (2020), Breyer led the majority in striking down state restrictions on abortion by finding that their burdens on reproductive care outweighed their benefits to patients. In response to Dobbs v. Jackson Women's Health Organization (2022) overturning Roe v. Wade (1973), Breyer jointly wrote the dissent with Justices Kagan and Sotomayor.

=== Affirmative action ===
In Gratz v. Bollinger (2003), Breyer concurred in the judgment that universities could not quantitatively advantage minority applicants, but he joined the majority in Grutter v. Bollinger (2003), which held that educational diversity was a compelling government interest. He also concurred in the judgment of Schuette v. BAMN (2014) that the Michigan Civil Rights Initiative's ban on affirmative action at public universities was enforceable, prompting criticism that the Court only defers to the political process when the outcome matches its preference.

In Parents Involved in Community Schools v. Seattle School District No. 1 (2007), Breyer wrote the lead dissent against holding desegregation busing unconstitutional unless remedying de jure segregation, arguing that de facto segregation deserved equal attention. At a 2014 symposium celebrating his first 20 years on the Supreme Court, Breyer lamented that his Parents Involved dissent was his most important opinion, yet none submitted essays on it, which constitutional law scholar Mark Tushnet interpreted as the majority winning the fight to interpret Brown v. Board of Education (1954).

=== Death penalty ===
Breyer has consistently opposed capital punishment as often violating the Eighth Amendment's prohibition on cruel and unusual punishment, voting with the majority in Atkins v. Virginia (2002) and Roper v. Simmons (2005). In Glossip v. Gross (2015), he dissented against a requirement that prisoners challenging the method of their execution must provide a known and available alternative. Breyer's dissent argued that evolving international standards likely made all impositions of the death penalty unconstitutional, reviving a position shared by his predecessor, Justice Blackmun.

=== Environment ===
During Breyer's confirmation hearings, law professor Thomas McGarity cautioned that he might be "hazardous to our health" based on his drafting of the Natural Gas Policy Act of 1978, which deregulated natural gas. Consumer advocate Ralph Nader similarly testified that Breyer's emphasis on cost-benefit analysis would make him hostile to federal environmental laws. But upon Breyer's retirement, professor Richard Lazarus concluded that he had left a friendly legacy for environmental law. The only case in which Breyer's vote determined the outcome against environmentalists was PennEast Pipeline Co. v. New Jersey (2021), which held that the Federal Energy Regulatory Commission could grant natural gas companies the authority to use eminent domain over land owned by state governments.

In the two most important cases on standing in environmental cases during his tenure, Friends of the Earth, Inc. v. Laidlaw Environmental Services, Inc. (2000) and Massachusetts v. EPA (2007), Breyer voted with the majority to support environmentalists suing polluters and government agencies. In County of Maui v. Hawaii Wildlife Fund (2020), Breyer wrote for the majority that the Clean Air Act required Maui County, Hawaii, to have a permit for its release of groundwater pollution into the ocean. Although the ruling was less broad than the Ninth Circuit's approach, environmentalist groups praised the decision as affirming the Clean Water Act.

=== Free speech ===
Under Breyer's framework of "active liberty", political speech would receive stronger First Amendment protections than commercial speech to ensure that people could freely elect their representatives and then have that democratic government impose effective business regulations. In concurrences to Snyder v. Phelps (2011) and United States v. Alvarez (2012), Breyer rejected liability for protests against same-sex marriage and lies about military awards as restrictions on political speech that should fail for overbreadth. In comparison, his dissent in Sorrell v. IMS Health Inc. (2011) argued that legislatures should be free to protect their constituents' privacy by restricting the sale of medical data.

Breyer's balancing of the speaker's interest in spreading their message against the government's regulatory interest draws from the free speech analysis of European courts. Accordingly, his concurrence in the judgment of Reed v. Town of Gilbert (2015) favors a balancing test for content-based regulations rather than uniform application of strict scrutiny. In Mahanoy Area School District v. B.L. (2021), he held that schools generally cannot punish students' off-campus speech, establishing "rules of thumb" rather than a categorical limitation. First Amendment litigator Floyd Abrams faults this proportionality analysis for ignoring the community's interest in hearing diverse perspectives. Legal scholar John Hart Ely had previously criticized balancing tests in free speech cases as furthering the judge's preferred viewpoint.

In free speech cases, Breyer consistently deferred to the government's invocation of the obscenity exception. In United States v. Playboy Entertainment Group, Inc. (2000), he dissented against striking down a requirement that cable operators restrict sexually oriented programming to nighttime. Breyer also concurred in United States v. American Library Ass'n (2003) that Congress could require public schools and libraries receiving E-Rate discounts to install an Internet filter.

=== Intellectual property ===
Breyer's rulings in intellectual property cases showcased his continuing skepticism of copyright. In dissents to Eldred v. Ashcroft (2003) and Golan v. Holder (2012), Breyer criticized retroactive extensions of copyright as economically unproductive and contrary to freedom of speech. In Kirtsaeng v. John Wiley & Sons, Inc. (2013), he held that the first-sale doctrine allows owners of textbooks sold abroad to resell them in the United States without the copyright holder's permission.

In MGM Studios, Inc. v. Grokster, Ltd. (2005), the Court unanimously held peer-to-peer file sharing companies Grokster and StreamCast Networks liable for copyright infringement because they marketed their products for such uses. In his concurrence, Breyer argued without such intent, Sony Corp. of America v. Universal City Studios, Inc. (1984) would protect these companies from liability because of their software's substantial non-infringing uses.

Praised for adapting copyright law to new technologies, Breyer's holding in Google LLC v. Oracle America, Inc. (2021) assumed that computer code was copyrightable but deemed Google's use of code from the Java programming language for its Android operating system protected fair use. In a rare instance of siding with copyright owners, Breyer held in ABC v. Aereo (2014) that Aereo's streaming of terrestrial television was sufficiently analogous to cable television to leave it liable for violating the Copyright Act of 1976.

Breyer was also described as "the patent law judge on the Court". Writing for a unanimous court in Mayo Collaborative Services v. Prometheus Laboratories, Inc. (2012), Breyer held that because a scientific law is not patentable subject matter, a diagnostic test that merely observes a patient's metabolization of a drug cannot be patented. In 2013, Breyer joined the majority in Association for Molecular Pathology v. Myriad Genetics, Inc., which applied his framework to invalidate gene patents for naturally occurring DNA sequences.

=== Native American law ===
Breyer's positions in cases involving Native American varied. In Chickasaw Nation v. United States (2001), his majority opinion denying the tax exemption for government-run lotteries to tribal pull-tab gambling was viewed as "the potential demise of the Indian canon of construction", which dictates that statutes should be interpreted in favor of Native Americans. In United States v. Lara (2004), Breyer held that the federal and tribal governments may prosecute non-member Native Americans for the same charges without violating the Double Jeopardy Clause, interpreting the Civil Rights Act of 1968 as deference to tribal sovereignty. He was criticized for concurring in Adoptive Couple v. Baby Girl (2013) that the Indian Child Welfare Act's additional procedures for ending parental rights do not apply to non-custodial Native American biological fathers.

=== Religion ===
Breyer was praised for the difference between his votes in the 2005 cases Van Orden v. Perry and McCreary County v. American Civil Liberties Union, which dealt with public displays of the Ten Commandments. In the former, he concurred in the judgment to allow their display outside the Texas State Capitol; in the latter, he deemed their display inside Kentucky county courthouses unconstitutional. Framing the First Amendment as meant to reduce religious divisiveness, Breyer focused on the greater and immediate objection to the latter display.

=== Voting rights ===
Breyer dissented to the plurality holding in Vieth v. Jubelirer (2004) that partisan gerrymandering is a non-judiciable political question, and he joined the dissent in Rucho v. Common Cause (2019) against a majority opinion reaching the same conclusion. Writing for the majority in Alabama Legislative Black Caucus v. Alabama (2015), Breyer held that racial gerrymandering claims must be looked at district by district, rather than at the state level. Breyer joined dissents in Shelby County v. Holder (2013) and Brnovich v. Democratic National Committee (2021), both of which criticized decisions weakening portions of the Voting Rights Act of 1965.

== Retirement and post-retirement ==
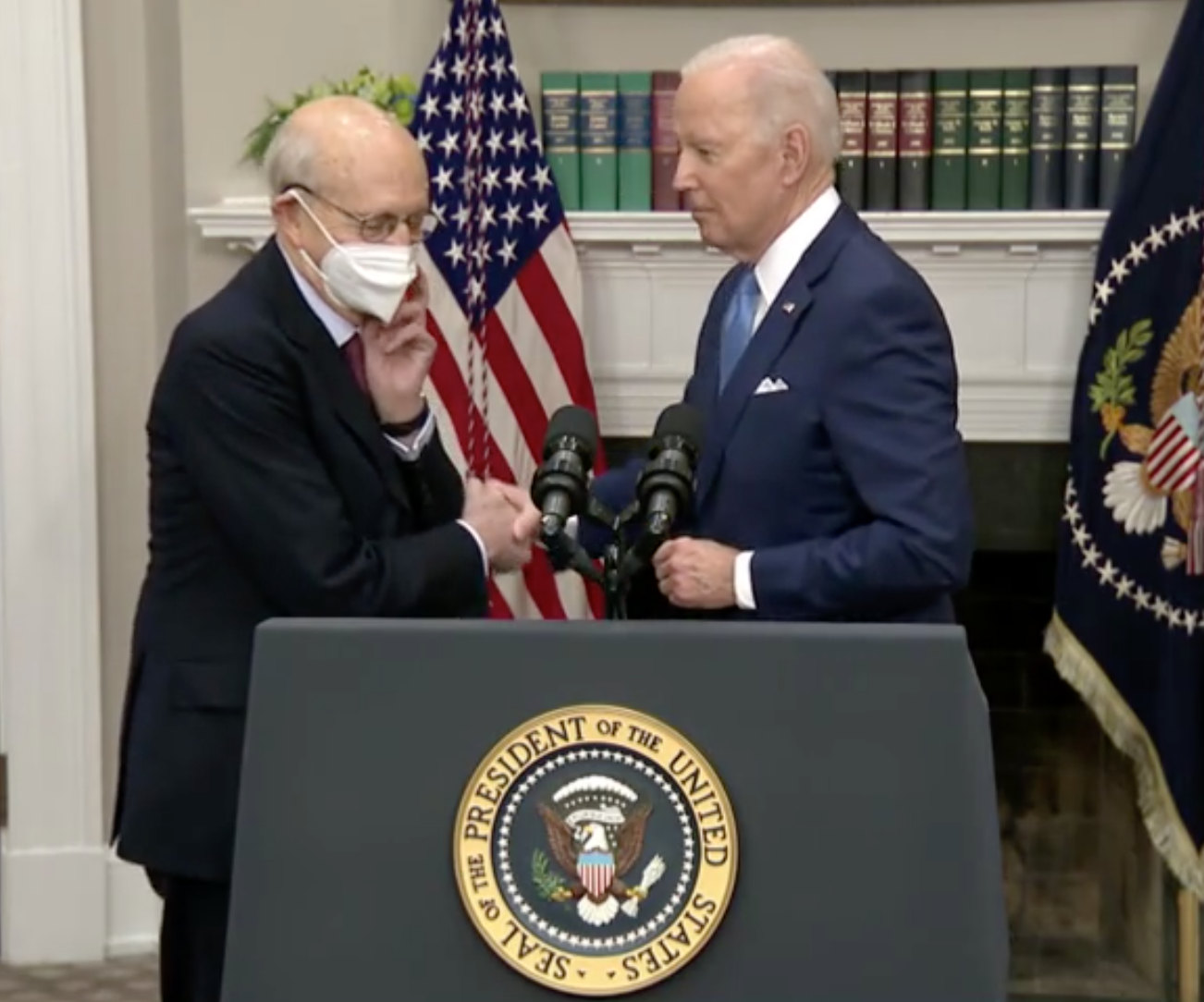
Breyer announcing his pending retirement alongside President Joe Biden on January 27, 2022

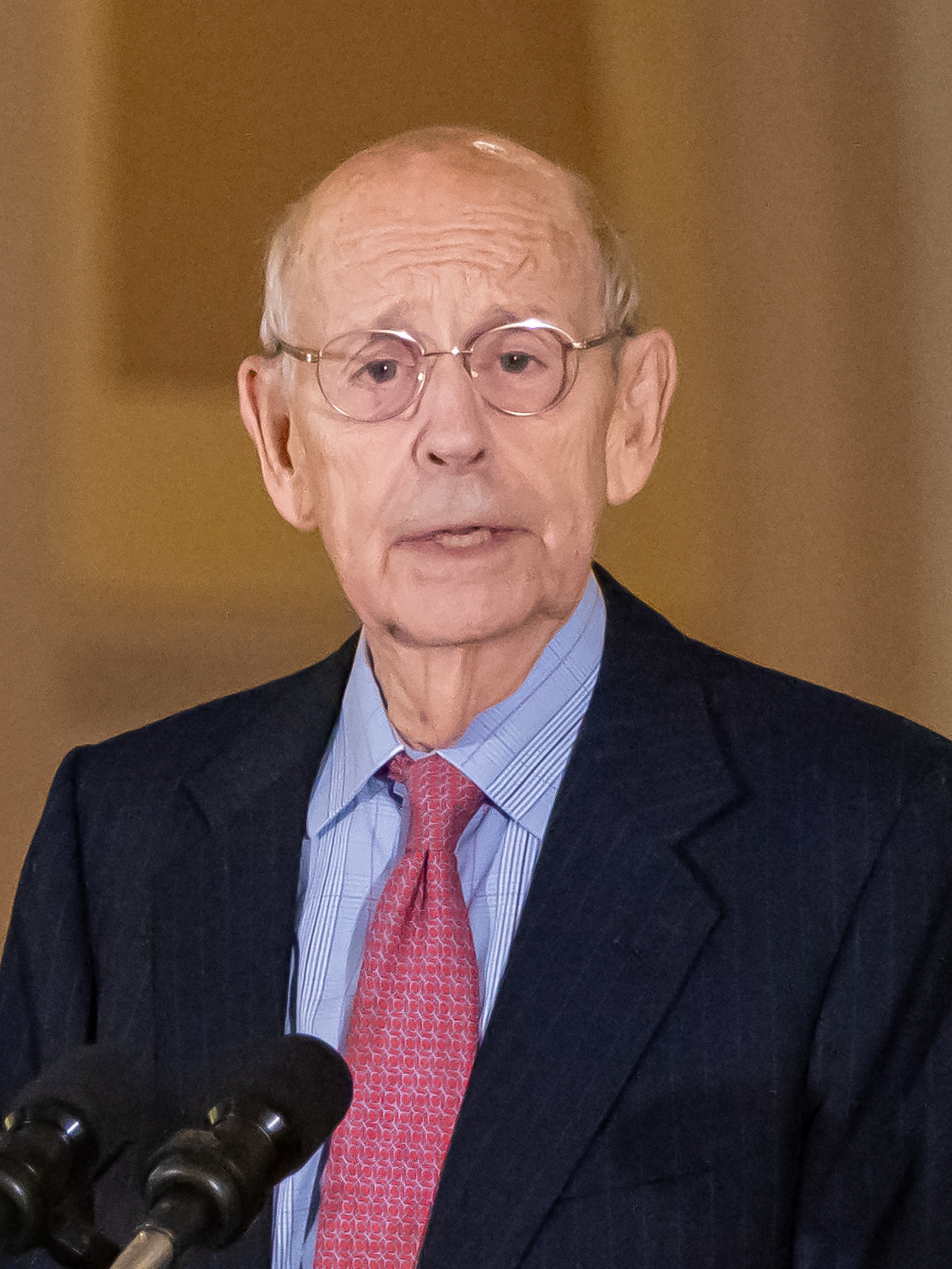
Breyer in 2024

After Democratic victories in the 2020 presidential and Senate elections, progressive activists and Democratic members of Congress called on Breyer to retire so that President Biden could nominate a younger liberal justice. In an August 2021 New York Times interview, Breyer said he wished to retire before his death, and recounted a conversation he had with Justice Antonin Scalia in which Scalia mentioned that he did not want his successor to "reverse everything I've done for the last 25 years". Breyer said that Scalia's point will "inevitably be in the psychology" of his decision to retire. In a September 2021 interview with Fox News's Chris Wallace, Breyer said activists calling for his retirement are "entitled to their opinion" and "I didn't retire because I had decided on balance I wouldn't retire". He said he took several factors into account when deciding his retirement plans, and reiterated that he did not plan to "die on the court".

On January 27, 2022, Breyer announced that he would retire from the Supreme Court. To succeed him, Biden nominated Ketanji Brown Jackson, a judge of the U.S. Court of Appeals for the D.C. Circuit who had once clerked for Breyer. The Senate confirmed her by a vote of 53–47 on April 7, 2022. Breyer's retirement took effect at noon on June 30, following the court's final opinions and orders for the term.

On July 2, 2022, it was announced that Breyer had been appointed Byrne Professor of Administrative Law and Process at Harvard Law School. Breyer had previously attended and taught at Harvard Law School. In May 2024, he received an honorary Doctor of Laws degree from Yale University in recognition of his contributions to the field of law and his nearly three decades of service on the Supreme Court. As a retired Supreme Court justice, Breyer can still sit as a judge in lower federal courts by designation. He first returned to the bench in 2025 in the First Circuit Court of Appeals, the court on which he was a judge before his Supreme Court appointment. Breyer attended the second inauguration of Donald Trump in 2025, appearing with the nine sitting Supreme Court justices.

== Judicial philosophy ==
Breyer is known for his pragmatic approach to legal interpretation, which emphasizes practical consequences and the purpose of legislation. Cass Sunstein described this outlook as one that "will tend to make the law more sensible" and praised Breyer's critiques of originalism as "powerful and convincing". In showcasing how Supreme Court decisions have complex real-world effects, Breyer often posed complex hypotheticals during oral arguments and proposed multi-factor balancing tests in his opinions. While these hypotheticals were sometimes criticized as meandering, Breyer continued this approach to oral arguments when he returned to the First Circuit in 2025.

Breyer consistently voted in favor of abortion rights, one of the most controversial areas of the Supreme Court's docket. He also defended the Court's use of foreign law and international law as persuasive authority in its decisions. Breyer advocated for cooperative federalism in his dissents to the Rehnquist Court's narrowing of Congress's Commerce Clause authority in United States v. Lopez (1995) and United States v. Morrison (2000). He demonstrated a consistent pattern of deference to Congress, voting to overturn congressional legislation at a lower rate than any other justice since 1994.

Breyer's extensive experience in administrative law is accompanied by his staunch defense of the Federal Sentencing Guidelines. He rejects the strict interpretation of the Sixth Amendment espoused by Justice Scalia that all facts necessary to criminal punishment must be submitted to a jury and proved beyond a reasonable doubt. In many other areas on the Court, too, Breyer's pragmatism was considered the intellectual counterweight to Scalia's textualism. For example, in NLRB v. Noel Canning (2014), Breyer led a 5-4 majority in interpreting the Recess Appointment Clause based on its purpose of filling vacancies, whereas Scalia dissented in favor of the clause's plain meaning.

In describing the methods of his interpretive philosophy, Breyer has sometimes noted his use of six interpretive tools: text, history, tradition, precedent, the purpose of a statute, and the consequences of competing interpretations. He has noted that only the last two differentiate him from textualists such as Scalia. Breyer argues that these sources are necessary, however, and in the former case (purpose), can in fact provide greater objectivity in legal interpretation than looking merely at what is often ambiguous statutory text. With the latter (consequences), Breyer argues that considering the impact of legal interpretations is a further way of ensuring consistency with a law's intended purpose.

Breyer describes this philosophy as the "traditional approach" of interpreting American law, citing the work of Supreme Court Justices Oliver Wendell Holmes Jr., Benjamin N. Cardozo, and Louis Brandeis. He argues that, when faced with textual uncertainty about the law, the judge cannot only look at the words themselves, but "recognize the limits of language in conveying meaning" enabling them to understand why the law was written in a particular way, what purpose that law seeks to serve and problems it seeks to avoid.

=== Active Liberty ===
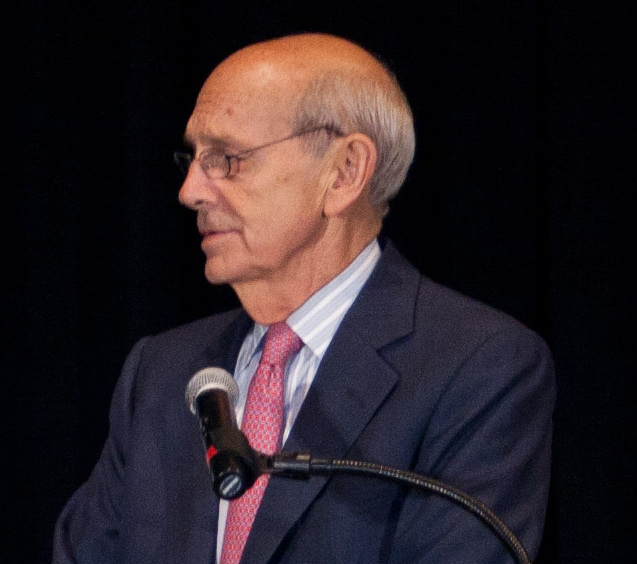
Breyer in 2011

In 2005, Breyer published Active Liberty: Interpreting Our Democratic Constitution, which urges judges to interpret legal texts in light of their purpose and the consequences of a ruling. The book is considered a response to Antonin Scalia's 1997 book A Matter of Interpretation, emphasized adherence to the original meaning of the text alone. In Active Liberty, Breyer argues that the Framers of the Constitution sought to establish a democratic government that would maximize both "negative liberty" (freedom from government coercion) and "positive liberty" (freedom to participate in government). In Breyer's terminology, the latter is the "active liberty" that judges should champion by supporting the public's self-governance with their decisions.

Political scientist Peter Berkowitz has criticized Breyer's view that the Due Process Clause confers a right to abortion as restraining democratically elected state legislatures and Congress from enacting abortion restrictions. Legal scholar Cass Sunstein has rebutted that among the nine justices of the Rehnquist Court, Breyer had the highest percentage of votes to uphold acts of Congress and defer to Executive Branch decisions. Legal author Jeffrey Toobin framed Breyer's view as upholding judges' responsibility to enforce the limits of the Constitution. In a 2006 discussion at New York Historical, Breyer noted that democratic means did not end slavery and that judicial intervention was needed to enforce "one man, one vote" and broader civil and political rights that provide the basis for democratic decision-making.

=== Other books ===
External videos
- Justice Stephen Breyer: The Court And The World, 1:14:57, WGBH Forum Network

In 2010, Breyer published a second book, Making Our Democracy Work: A Judge's View. In it, he argues that judges have six tools they can use to determine a legal provision's proper meaning: (1) text; (2) historical context; (3) precedent; (4) tradition; (5) purpose; and (6) consequences of potential interpretations. Textualists, such as Antonin Scalia, feel comfortable using only the first four of these tools, while pragmatists, like Breyer, believe that "purpose" and "consequences" are particularly important interpretative tools.

Breyer cites several watershed moments in Supreme Court history to show why the consequences of a particular ruling should always be in a judge's mind. He notes that President Jackson ignored the Court's ruling in Worcester v. Georgia, which led to the Trail of Tears and severely weakened the Court's authority. He also cites the Dred Scott decision, an important precursor to the American Civil War. When the Court ignores the consequences of its decisions, Breyer argues, it can lead to devastating and destabilizing outcomes.

In 2015, Breyer published The Court and the World: American Law and the New Global Realities, which argues that globalization requires that U.S. courts show greater appreciation of foreign and international law. On March 26, 2024, Breyer published Reading the Constitution: Why I Chose Pragmatism, Not Textualism. In an interview coinciding with its release, he lamented that textualism "will not help achieve the goals of those who write statutes or those who wrote and adopted the Constitution". In January 2025, he published the article, "Pragmatism or Textualism", which builds upon the main points in presented in Reading the Constitution and provides further examples of his interpretive philosophy.

== Publications ==
- Breyer, Stephen G.; MacAvoy, Paul W. (1974). Energy Regulation by the Federal Power Commission. Washington, DC: Brookings Institution. ISBN 9780815710769. OCLC 866410.
- Breyer, Stephen G.; Stewart, Richard B. (1979). Administrative Law and Regulatory Policy (1st ed.). New York: Little, Brown and Company.
- Breyer, Stephen G. (1982). Regulation and its Reform (1st ed.). Cambridge, MA: Harvard University Press.
- Breyer, Stephen (Fall 1988). "The Federal Sentencing Guidelines and Key Compromises Upon Which They Rest". Hofstra Law Review. 17 (1): 1–50. Archived from the original on October 5, 2017.
- Breyer, Stephen G. (1994). Breaking the Vicious Cycle: Toward Effective Risk Regulation. Cambridge, MA: Harvard University Press. ISBN 9780674081147. OCLC 246886908.
- Breyer, Stephen (2005). Active Liberty: Interpreting Our Democratic Constitution. New York: Vintage Books. ISBN 0-307-27494-2.
- Breyer, Stephen G.; Stewart, Richard B.; Sunstein, Cass R.; Vermeule, Adrian (2006). Administrative Law and Regulatory Policy: Problems, Text, and Cases (6th ed.). Boston, MA: Aspen Publishers. ISBN 978-0735556065.
- Breyer, Stephen (2010). Making Our Democracy Work: A Judge's View. New York: A. A. Knopf. ISBN 9780307269911. OCLC 813897125.
- Breyer, Stephen (2015). The Court and the World: American Law and the New Global Realities. New York: Penguin Random House. ISBN 9781101912072. OCLC 952026314.
- Breyer, Stephen G.; Bessler, John D. (2016). Against the Death Penalty. Washington, DC: Brookings Institution. ISBN 9780815728900. OCLC 948669357.
- Breyer, Stephen G. (2020). Breaking the Promise of Brown: The Resegregation of America's Schools. Washington, DC: Brookings Institution Press. ISBN 9780815731665. OCLC 1197773870.
- Breyer, Stephen (2021). The Authority of the Court and the Peril of Politics. Cambridge, MA: Harvard University Press. ISBN 9780674269361. OCLC 1246624044.
- Breyer, Stephen (2024). Reading the Constitution: Why I Chose Pragmatism, Not Textualism. New York: Simon & Schuster. ISBN 9781668021538. OCLC 1427062034.
- Breyer, Stephen (January 2025). "Pragmatism or Textualism". Harvard Law Review. 138 (3): 717–773.

== See also ==
- Bill Clinton Supreme Court candidates
- Demographics of the Supreme Court of the United States
- List of justices of the Supreme Court of the United States
- List of law clerks for the second seat of the Supreme Court of the United States
- List of United States federal judges by longevity of service
- List of United States Supreme Court cases by the Rehnquist Court
- List of United States Supreme Court cases by the Roberts Court
- List of United States Supreme Court justices by time in office

Legal offices
New seat	Judge of the United States Court of Appeals for the First Circuit; 1980–1994	Succeeded by Sandra Lynch
Preceded by Levin H. Campbell	Chief Judge of the United States Court of Appeals for the First Circuit; 1990–1994	Succeeded by Juan R. Torruella
Preceded by Harry Blackmun	Associate Justice of the Supreme Court of the United States; 1994–2022	Succeeded by Ketanji Brown Jackson
U.S. order of precedence (ceremonial)
Preceded by Anthony Kennedy as Retired Associate Justice of the Supreme Court	Order of precedence of the United States as Retired Associate Justice of the Supreme Court	Succeeded by Scott Bessent as Secretary of the Treasury
