= Meta Schumann =

American composer

Meta Fust Willoughby (1887 - 3 October 1937) was an American composer, pianist, and singer who performed and published under the name Meta Schumann.

== Life and career ==
Schumann was born in St. Paul, Minnesota. Her first teacher was her father, the choral conductor and singer William Fust. Her brother, Carl J. Fust, was a violinist with the Minneapolis Symphony Orchestra. Schumann married Clarence Willoughby and they had one son, William.

Schumann studied music with C. C. Carman and Carina Mastinelli in Minnesota, and with John B. Acton in London. She established a studio in New York City during the 1920s, and toured the U.S. as a singer and accompanist. She accompanied and coached Alma Beck, Henrietta Conrad, Edith Hallett Frank, Elena Gerhardt, Dusolina Giannini, Frieda Klink, Norman Jollif, Jane Laval, Eleanor Patterson, George Reimherr, Ottilie Schillig, William Simmons, Cornelius van Vliet, Frederic Warren, and Olga Warren.

Schumann belonged to the New York Singing Teachers’ Association and sang with the Choral Society of the New York City Christian Science Institute. Her music was published by G. Ricordi & Company and White, Smith & Company.

=== Legacy ===
Schumann was known as an outstanding vocal teacher. A 1935 review by Spanish opera singer Lucrezia Bori stated,

The voices of Mmc. Meta Sciiumann's pupils prove that she has mastered the art of Voice Culture and I unhesitatingly say that anyone placing his or her voice in Mme. Schumann's care is certain of the most competent vocal training.

Another advertisement in Musical America featured a quote from German soprano Elisabeth Rethberg:

| have known Meta Schumann for mamy years as 2 musician, teacher, and composer. She is a woman of exceptionally high cultural standing, which is reflected in her entire work. Her methods of wocal teaching are very much to my liking, and | have frequently had occasion to observe in her pupils how their splendid progress prowes the soundness of Mme. Schumann's principles.

The high quality of her musicianship is based upom the equally high quality of her character and personality, and whemewer | am asked to recommend to young and aspiring singers a thoroughly reliable vocal teacher, | always advise them to turn to Meta Schumann for instruction, a that, if Mme. Schumann takes care of them, they are in the best hands.

These facts, known to me for many years, make me feel sure that those seeking vocal instruction may safely entrust themselves to Mme. Schumann's teaching.

== Selected works list ==
Schumann’s compositions, all for voice, include:

- Cloudlets
- June Pastoral Song
- Medea
- Night
- Recompense (text by Josephine M. Fabricant)
- Spring
- Thee (text by Florence Parr Gere)
- Thou Immortal Night (text by Mina Verne Hammer)
- To a Star in June
- When Thou Art Night (text by Thomas Moore)
- Why Not?
- Winding Lane
