= Hofheimer =

Hofheimer is a surname. Notable people with the surname include:

- Meister Pauls Hoffheimer, a.k.a. Paul Hofhaimer, Paulus Hofhaymer etc. (1459–1537), Austrian composer
- Aline Rhonie Hofheimer (1909–1963), American aviator
- Charlie Hofheimer (born 1981), American film, television and theatre actor
- Grace Hofheimer (1891–1965), American pianist

== See also ==
- Hofheimer's, American retail company, now defunct
