= White-Smith Music Publishing Co. v. Apollo Co. =

White-Smith Music Publishing Company v. Apollo Company
- Supreme Court of the United States

Argued January 16–17, 1908 Decided February 24, 1908
- Full case name: White-Smith Music Publishing Company, Appt., v. Apollo Company
- Citations: 209 U.S. 1 (more) 28 S. Ct. 319; 52 L. Ed. 655; 1908 U.S. LEXIS 1766

Holding
- Music rolls for pianos do not require royalty payments because sheet music copyrights do not cover mechanical parts.

Court membership
- Chief Justice Melville Fuller Associate Justices John M. Harlan · David J. Brewer; Edward D. White · Rufus W. Peckham; Joseph McKenna · Oliver W. Holmes Jr. William R. Day · William H. Moody

Case opinions
- Majority: Day, joined by unanimous
- Concurrence: Holmes
- Superseded by
- Copyright Act of 1909

White-Smith Music Publishing Company v. Apollo Company, 209 U.S. 1 (1908), was a decision by the Supreme Court of the United States which ruled that manufacturers of music rolls for player pianos did not have to pay royalties to the composers. The ruling was based on a holding that the piano rolls were not copies of the plaintiffs' copyrighted sheet music, but were instead parts of the machine that reproduced the music.

This case was subsequently eclipsed by Congress's intervention in the form of an amendment to the Copyright Act of 1909, introducing a compulsory license for the manufacture and distribution of such "mechanical" embodiments of musical works.

== Issue and relevance ==
The main issue was whether or not something had to be directly perceptible (meaning intelligible to an ordinary human being) for it to be a "copy." Naturally, hardly anyone could perceive (read) music by looking at a roll of paper with holes in it. The 1976 Copyright Act later clarified the issue, defining a "copy" as a "material object . . . in which a work is fixed . . . and from which the work can be perceived, reproduced, or otherwise communicated, either directly or with the aid of a machine or device." This case remains relevant because the 1976 Copyright Act makes an "otherwise inexplicable distinction between 'copies' and 'phonorecords.'"

Perhaps the greatest relevance of White-Smith, however, is that it foreshadowed the debate over whether object code (computer program code in the form of 0s and 1s encoded in a magnetic tape or disc or in an EPROM) was protected by US copyright law. In the early 1980s the issue was in considerable doubt, and initially several lower court decisions held that object code was not a "copy" of a computer program. Two court of appeals decisions involving copying of Apple computers and their software were influential in reversing the tide. They upheld the protectability of object code embodiments of computer programs and rejected the supposed requirement that a candidate for status as a work of authorship must communicate a message to human readers or perceivers. These decisions wrote the human-intelligibility requirement of White-Smith out of copyright law, as a qualification for investiture of copyright, although the "piano-roll amendment" had only established that human-intelligibility was not a requirement for an infringing "copy." In principle, what infringes could be broader than what gives rise to copyright, on the theory that works of authorship need a hedge or moat around them to assure adequate protection. But that does not appear to be the law.

The White-Smith case also appears to be the source of a legal metaphor used in US patent law relating to computer programs. As explained in greater detail in the Wikipedia article Piano Roll Blues, the legal fiction developed in US patent law that placing a new program in an old general-purpose digital computer creates a new computer and thus a "new machine" for purposes of section 101 of the US patent statute (listing patent-eligible subject matter). Critics of this argument derisively termed it the "Old Piano Roll Blues," meaning that the argument was equivalent to asserting that placing a new piano roll into an old player piano transformed it into a new player piano. The 2014 decision of the United States Supreme Court in Alice Corp. v. CLS Bank International appears to have extinguished the piano roll blues argument by holding that simply saying "apply it with a computer" will not transform a patent-ineligible claim to an idea into a patent-eligible claim.

== See also ==
- List of United States Supreme Court cases, volume 209
- White, Smith & Company
