= Coercive logic =

Form of logic

Coercive logic is a concept popularized by mathematician Raymond Smullyan, in which a person who has agreed to answer a question truthfully is forced to perform an undesired action, because failing to do so would mean breaking their agreement. Smullyan presents the concept as a question:

Suppose I offer you a million dollars to answer a yes/no question truthfully, would you accept the offer? If so, you shouldn't, for I would then ask: Will you either answer no to this question or pay me two million dollars? The only way you can answer truthfully is by answering yes and then paying me two million dollars.

Smullyan's question asks the reader whether at least one of the two options is true:

1. They will truthfully answer no to his question.
2. They will pay him two million dollars.

The reader cannot truthfully answer no, as doing so would assert that both of the statements were false: "no, my answer is not no" and "no, I will not pay you two million dollars." The first of these is a self-contradictory statement.

If the reader answers yes, they cannot be saying that "will truthfully answer no" is true (as they did not answer no). Thus, they must be asserting that "will pay two million dollars" is true, and therefore must give Smullyan two million dollars.

Smullyan credits his son-in-law, Jack Kotik, with the name of the process.
