= Yu Cong Eng v. Trinidad =

- Supreme Court of the United States

Argued April 12–13, 1926 Decided June 7, 1926
- Full case name: Yu Cong Eng, et al. v. Trinidad, Collector, et al.
- Citations: 271 U.S. 500 (more) 46 S. Ct. 619; 70 L. Ed. 1059; 1926 U.S. LEXIS 642

Case history
- Prior: Supreme Court of the Philippines

Holding
- The Chinese Bookkeeping Act violated the Due Process and Equal Protection Clauses of the Philippine Autonomy Act.

Court membership
- Chief Justice William H. Taft Associate Justices Oliver W. Holmes Jr. · Willis Van Devanter; James C. McReynolds · Louis Brandeis; George Sutherland · Pierce Butler; Edward T. Sanford · Harlan F. Stone

Case opinion
- Majority: Taft, joined by unanimous

Laws applied
- Philippine Autonomy Act

Yu Cong Eng v. Trinidad, 271 U.S. 500 (1926), was a United States Supreme Court case in which the Court held that a law passed by the US colonial government of the Philippines in 1921, Act No. 2972 of the Philippine Legislature, known as the "Chinese Bookkeeping Act", was unconstitutional. It prevented business records from being kept in the Chinese language.

== Background ==
Act No. 2972, approved on February 21, 1921, prohibited businesses from keeping account books in any language other than English, Spanish, or a local dialect. Violations were punishable by a fine of up to 10,000 pesos, imprisonment for up to two years, or both. The law took effect on January 1, 1923.

Yu Cong Eng was arrested for violating the law, and his account books were seized. Before his trial began, he and Co Liam petitioned the Supreme Court of the Philippines to prevent enforcement of the law.
