= Hartsville Oil Mill v. United States =

- Supreme Court of the United States

Argued March 3, 4, 1926 Decided April 12, 1926
- Full case name: Hartsville Oil Mill v. United States
- Citations: 271 U.S. 43 (more) 46 S. Ct. 389; 70 L. Ed. 822; 1926 U.S. LEXIS 860; 42 Cont.Cas.Fed. (CCH) ¶ 77,306

Case history
- Prior: 60 Ct.Cl. 712, 1925 WL 2676 (Ct.Cl.)

Holding
- Affirmed

Court membership
- Chief Justice William H. Taft Associate Justices Oliver W. Holmes Jr. · Willis Van Devanter; James C. McReynolds · Louis Brandeis; George Sutherland · Pierce Butler; Edward T. Sanford · Harlan F. Stone

Case opinion
- Per curiam
- Sutherland took no part in the consideration or decision of the case.

Hartsville Oil Mill v. United States, 271 U.S. 43 (1926), is a United States Supreme Court case in which the Court held that the jurisdiction of the Court of Claims was not enlarged by Congressional reference legislation when the court already had jurisdiction to hear the case under another section of the Judicial Code. Additionally the court held that modification to the contract in question was not by duress as there had not been an inadequate power in the courts to remedy the effects of the threatened actions.

== Background ==
On September 26, 1918, the government made a contract with Hartsville Oil Mill, a cottonseed producer, which was replicated with several other cottonseed producers for the delivery of cotton linters. Cotton linters, a by-product of the cotton crushing process, were used by the government in World War I for the production of explosives. Of the production of 2,250,000 pounds, 270,000 bales were on hand and inspected when armistice was declared in late 1918. At this time the government informed the producers that it intended to cancel the contract and would only accept 150,000 bales if the producers agreed to a contract modification. Faced with this repudiation of the contract, the producers agreed to the modification and sought recovery by petition to the U.S. Senate under Judicial Code § 145, the predecessor to 28 U.S.C. § 1492.

== Case details ==
Following the passage of a Senate Resolution numbered 448 on March 23, 1922, referring Senate bill numbered 4479 March 3, 1922 to the Court of Federal Claims, the producers filed a case with the Court of Claims requesting they investigate the matter and report to the Senate. However, the Court of Claims determined that it held jurisdiction over the contract dispute under Judicial Code § 7 and heard the case under its Article III jurisdiction. While the producers alleged that they had been forced to agree to the modification of the contract under duress of the government's threat of repudiation of the original contract, the Court of Claims held that there was no duress. They reasoned that the producers negotiated with the government for several weeks and that the government gave up concessions which constituted consideration for contractual purposes. As such, there was no duress as the plaintiffs had substantial time, prior to agreeing to the modification, to seek redress in a court of law for their claims under the original contract and that therefore the remedies at law were not inadequate as to invoke the doctrine of duress.

== Appeal ==
On appeal to the Supreme Court, the producers contested the Court of Claims findings of jurisdiction and on the element of duress in the contract, alleging a lack of jurisdiction, the existence of duress, and a lack of consideration for the contract. Writing for the court, Justice Harlan F. Stone affirmed the decision of the lower court and found against the producers on their claims. He argued that the Senate resolution referring the case to the Court of Claims had no effect on and did not enlarge its jurisdiction. The case is known for establishing the idea that the Court of Claims' jurisdiction under its judicial authority would supersede its congressional jurisdiction where the two conflicted.

== See also ==
- Southern Pacific Terminal Co. v. ICC: appeals on cotton shipments
- Ware & Leland v. Mobile County: federal jurisdiction on cotton futures
