= Harold Bradley (pianist) =

Canadian pianist (1906–1984)

James Harold Bradley (March 4, 1906 – November 10, 1984), was a pianist and the Founder and Principal of the Bradley Institute for Music Education Research.

== Early life ==
Bradley was the only son of James Clark Bradley, a grocery store owner in Niagara Falls, Ontario, Canada, and his wife, Madge Marsland Bradley.

As a boy, Harold worked in his father's grocery store and played baseball, where he earned the lifelong nickname "Scoop". His father was a well-known baseball player, and determined that a professional baseball career was best for Bradley. At the age of 16, he was taken to Toronto by Harold "Touch" Wood, who assured him a professional contract at the end of his first year in college. He attended Simcoe Street Public School and Niagara Falls Collegiate and Vocational Institute.

His career in music began at the age of 12, when he got his first job playing the organ in the Anglican Church in the village of Chippawa, Ontario, and later playing jazz with a dance orchestra in Niagara Falls, Ontario, at the age of 14.

At 16, Harold moved to Toronto to begin a bachelor's degree in the arts course at Trinity College, University of Toronto, and to pursue a career in baseball as third baseman for the Toronto Wellingtons. Following his first year at university, Bradley returned to Niagara Falls in the summer of 1923, where he earned $45 a week playing the theatre organ – one of the newly designed Wurlitzers – at the renovated Queen Theatre in Niagara Falls.

It was at this time that Harold met the renowned John Pierce Langs, a pianist and composer living in Niagara Falls, NY, who became a lifelong friend.Amherst School of Music Langs had studied under Edward MacDowell in New York, Liebling in Germany, and several other famous teachers in Europe.Guide to Langs Collection

Back in Toronto, Bradley met the pianist Mark Hambourg, and Mark's younger brothers Jan and Boris. The Hambourgs convinced Bradley that he couldn't play baseball in the winter and that he ought to develop his musical talent. With the Hambourgs, he began playing concerts at Massey Hall under the auspices of the Hambourg Concert Society and earned a reputation as a concert pianist of note.

At 17, he was an assistant conductor of the Canadian Opera Festival company under Reginald Stewart, and began lessons under Mark Hambourg. By the age of 18 he was assistant conductor of the Canadian Opera Company. He graduated from the university at age 20 and was encouraged to go to Oxford University in Britain to pursue a view of literature and the arts through music.

== Paris years ==
At the end of Bradley's fourth year at the University of Toronto, he befriended a young Oxford professor visiting Toronto, who encouraged him to apply to study English Literature at Oxford. His application was successful, and in the spring of 1930 Bradley made plans to travel to the UK on the ocean-liner Olympic. On board the Olympic, Harold was pressed into playing a teatime concert for fellow guests. After the concert, he was approached by the great bass baritone Edmund Burke and his wife, who would become a second family for Bradley during his stay in Europe and for years after.

It was en route to Oxford on board the Olympic that Harold made the decision to detour to Paris. His friend Reginald Stewart had offered to introduce Harold to the famous French pianist and music teacher Isidor Philipp. Philipp's studio was in his home, where he lived with his sister, near the Conservatoire de Paris. The day that Bradley visited, Philipp was meeting with his close friend Polish-American pianist Leopold Godowsky, playing with him on the Erard piano in his studio. After Godowsky's visit, Harold played and Philipp agreed to teach him.

Harold immediately gave up his plans to study at Oxford and committed to staying in Paris. He found lodgings with a Russian couple at the Place L’Alma, and commenced lessons with Philipp, who charged $14 an hour, the equivalent of about 350 francs. In Paris, Harold's friendship with the Burkes blossomed. It was through the Burkes that he made the acquaintance of various European diplomats and entered the elite social world of the Paris artists.

In 1932, Bradley received news that his mother had suffered a heart attack, and he returned to Niagara Falls, Canada. He spent the next three years traveling between London, New York, and Paris, playing concerts and developing his ideas about music education.

== Later years ==
One of Bradley's greatest accomplishments was in taking the principles that Philipp used in his teaching, and tailoring them for the instruction of very young students. He believed strongly that music could be used as a way to teach pre-verbal infants how to think, and that music could be used to inculcate the principles of math, science and art, and to instill a lifelong interest in intellectual development and culture. His work on the role of right- and left-handedness in piano instruction, which ultimately connected music to psychology and the work of the American doctor Norman Gibson, became a foundational part of this pedagogy. As his theories of music education developed, Bradley became less and less interested in teaching budding concert pianists, and more interested in teaching music teachers how to teach.

In 1936, Harold married Shirley Upper, a friend he had known since childhood. In 1939, they had a son, James Michael.

In addition to his teaching during the war years, Bradley performed a series of weekly radio concerts, often joined by his friend John Pierce Langs, that were broadcast live from WHLD radio station in Niagara Falls, NY. Over the course of three seasons, consisting of forty weeks each, the pair played through much of the classical repertoire of two-piano pieces.

== The Bradley Institute for Music Education Research ==
In the 1970s, Bradley's school of music was formalized and the Bradley Institute for Music Education Research emerged with the purpose of developing young minds through music education. It was the only school that Philipp allowed his name to be associated with, and it reflected his approach to music. Grace Barnes, an early student of both Bradley's and Philipp's, became a teacher at the school, and together with Deryck Aird, the three worked to promote the principles established by Philipp and Bradley. The institute, once located above a bank on Queen Street in Niagara Falls, found a permanent home in 1984 when they purchased a building located on the same street.

Bradley continued to play and teach, and served on the Niagara Falls Board of Education for 24 consecutive years starting in 1938. He focused on both administration and education in schools and discussed this in an article he wrote for "The School Secondary Edition."

Harold Bradley died in November 1984. His school, The Bradley Institute for Music Education Research in Niagara Falls, Ontario, continued to operate and teach students until 2008. Grace Barnes, Deryck Aird, Carolyn Goerzen and Ruth Johnston continued teaching until the closing of the school.

Bradley's students included Grace Barnes (President of the Bradley Institute 1984–2008), Estelle Siefert, Patricia Minnes, Karen Bredin, Sandra Burrus, Steven Bianchi (Founder and Director of The Amherst School of Music), Randall Reade, Lyn Celenza Dyster, Randall Aird, Charlene Aird, Laurie Mango, Wayne Breloff, Doug Monroe, Glen Tilyou, Ken Atkinson, Rivoli Iesulauro, Todd Dutchyn, Carolyn (Thomas) Goerzen (President of the Bradley Institute 2008-), Paul Dyster (Mayor of Niagara Falls, NY), Dennis Kucherawy, Jay Bianchi, Lois Vaughan, Carole J. Harris, Gretchen Heyroth Burrus and composer/recording artist Marcangelo Perricelli.

== Teaching and research ==
In a 1969 interview with the "St. Catharine's Standard," a local Ontario newspaper, Bradley said that Philipp in 1930 pointed out that practically everyone plays best with their right hand and has great difficulty developing the left hand technique, even if a left-handed person. Bradley decided that it might be interesting to give equal emphasis upon both hands from the very start of piano lessons. For the rest of his life, he explored this possibility and its results. "It was demonstrated that when children had an early start at the piano and the demands on both hands were equal, both sides of the brain developed equally and a well balanced personality resulted. During these observations it was also discovered that children can learn music at a very early age, even before learning anything else of value."

Bradley chose Grace Barnes, a student of both Phillip and Bradley, to assembled a team of experts who put the children through testing and found that children can absorb music and begin formal studies before the age of 18 months, and would soon be able to play and sing in tune. She further found that nobody is absolutely unmusical, "for if you are taught to develop your sense of hearing early enough, you become musical. Unmusical persona are merely those who have not had the opportunity to develop their ability.

Bradley's researchers, headed up by Grace Barnes, concluded that "When children have reached the age of two, they have learned the hardest of all: to walk and talk. In so doing, they have expended a tremendous amount of energy but after that, there is no demand upon that energy until they reach school age. These are the years that should be used by means of music to perpetuate this struggling upward and prevent the wonderful forces the organism has developed from falling into decay through disuse. Musical children develop a better intelligence, for they have been taught to use their brains."

The interviewer asked Bradley what was the most important discovery from his research, and he quoted Plato's thoughts that music molds character and leads the soul toward a disposition to justice. Expanding up on that, Bradley added, "Music can best serve its purpose in education as a means to a greater end, the building of character. Used wisely it will produce unfailing self-discipline in the highest degree, reliability, genuine consideration for others and a built-in tolerance against that which is unjust. Above all, a compulsion to put into action that which one believes and feels to be right and just."

Contemporaneous to that interview, Bradley was also interviewed by E. H. Lampard for another newspaper. Bradley stated that he began his association with Philipp in 1930 that lasted until Philipp's death in 1958. Philipp chose Bradley to carry on his great tradition of musical learning because Bradley's Institute "had done the greatest service to piano music in our time." The Institute began its research through Dr. Norman Gibson, who indicated that a string program should be a part of the institute. Long-time concertmaster for the New York Philharmonic John Corigliano, Sr., and Deryck Aird directed this program, and Grace Barnes directed the preschool and piano education field.
