= Dun v. Lumbermen's Credit Ass'n =

- Supreme Court of the United States

Argued January 31, 1908 Decided February 24, 1908
- Full case name: Dun v. Lumbermen's Credit Association
- Citations: 209 U.S. 20 (more) 28 S. Ct. 335; 52 L. Ed. 663

Holding
- The existence of some copyright-infringing information in a rote reference work does not entitle the original author to seek an injunction against the printing the later article when the later article's contents demonstrate significant original work.

Court membership
- Chief Justice Melville Fuller Associate Justices John M. Harlan · David J. Brewer; Edward D. White · Rufus W. Peckham; Joseph McKenna · Oliver W. Holmes Jr. William R. Day · William H. Moody

Case opinion
- Majority: Moody, joined by a unanimous court

Dun v. Lumbermen's Credit Ass'n, 209 U.S. 20 (1908), was a United States Supreme Court case in which the Court held the existence of some copyright-infringing information in a rote reference work does not entitle the original author to seek an injunction against the printing the later article when the later article's contents demonstrate significant original work.
