= List of United States Supreme Court cases, volume 209 =

Supreme Court of the United States
- Interactive map of Supreme Court of the United States
- 38°53′26″N 77°00′16″W
- Established: March 4, 1789; 236 years ago
- Location: Washington, D.C.
- Coordinates: 38°53′26″N 77°00′16″W
- Composition method: Presidential nomination with Senate confirmation
- Authorised by: Constitution of the United States, Art. III, § 1
- Judge term length: life tenure, subject to impeachment and removal
- Number of positions: 9 (by statute)
- Website: supremecourt.gov

This is a list of cases reported in volume 209 of United States Reports, decided by the Supreme Court of the United States in 1908.

== Justices of the Supreme Court at the time of volume 209 U.S. ==
The Supreme Court is established by Article III, Section 1 of the Constitution of the United States, which says: "The judicial Power of the United States, shall be vested in one supreme Court . . .". The size of the Court is not specified; the Constitution leaves it to Congress to set the number of justices. Under the Judiciary Act of 1789 Congress originally fixed the number of justices at six (one chief justice and five associate justices). Since 1789 Congress has varied the size of the Court from six to seven, nine, ten, and back to nine justices (always including one chief justice).

When the cases in volume 209 were decided the Court comprised the following nine members:

Portrait	Justice	Office	Home State	Succeeded	Date confirmed by the Senate (Vote)	Tenure on Supreme Court
	Melville Fuller	Chief Justice	Illinois	Morrison Waite	July 20, 1888 (41–20)	October 8, 1888 – July 4, 1910 (Died)
	John Marshall Harlan	Associate Justice	Kentucky	David Davis	November 29, 1877 (Acclamation)	December 10, 1877 – October 14, 1911 (Died)
	David Josiah Brewer	Associate Justice	Kansas	Stanley Matthews	December 18, 1889 (53–11)	January 6, 1890 – March 28, 1910 (Died)
	Edward Douglass White	Associate Justice	Louisiana	Samuel Blatchford	February 19, 1894 (Acclamation)	March 12, 1894 – December 18, 1910 (Continued as chief justice)
	Rufus W. Peckham	Associate Justice	New York	Howell Edmunds Jackson	December 9, 1895 (Acclamation)	January 6, 1896 – October 24, 1909 (Died)
	Joseph McKenna	Associate Justice	California	Stephen Johnson Field	January 21, 1898 (Acclamation)	January 26, 1898 – January 5, 1925 (Retired)
	Oliver Wendell Holmes Jr.	Associate Justice	Massachusetts	Horace Gray	December 4, 1902 (Acclamation)	December 8, 1902 – January 12, 1932 (Retired)
	William R. Day	Associate Justice	Ohio	George Shiras Jr.	February 23, 1903 (Acclamation)	March 2, 1903 – November 13, 1922 (Retired)
	William Henry Moody	Associate Justice	Massachusetts	Henry Billings Brown	December 12, 1906 (Acclamation)	December 17, 1906 – November 20, 1910 (Retired)

== Notable Case in 209 U.S. ==
=== Ex parte Young ===
In Ex parte Young, 209 U.S. 123 (1908), the Supreme Court held that suits in federal courts for injunctions against individual officials acting on behalf of states of the union may proceed despite the State's sovereign immunity, when the State acted contrary to any federal law or contrary to the Constitution. This ruling evaded the problem of the Eleventh Amendment, which prohibits states from being sued in federal court by citizens of other states.

== Citation style ==
Under the Judiciary Act of 1789 the federal court structure at the time comprised District Courts, which had general trial jurisdiction; Circuit Courts, which had mixed trial and appellate (from the US District Courts) jurisdiction; and the United States Supreme Court, which had appellate jurisdiction over the federal District and Circuit courts—and for certain issues over state courts. The Supreme Court also had limited original jurisdiction (i.e., in which cases could be filed directly with the Supreme Court without first having been heard by a lower federal or state court). There were one or more federal District Courts and/or Circuit Courts in each state, territory, or other geographical region.

The Judiciary Act of 1891 created the United States Courts of Appeals and reassigned the jurisdiction of most routine appeals from the district and circuit courts to these appellate courts. The Act created nine new courts that were originally known as the "United States Circuit Courts of Appeals." The new courts had jurisdiction over most appeals of lower court decisions. The Supreme Court could review either legal issues that a court of appeals certified or decisions of court of appeals by writ of certiorari.

Bluebook citation style is used for case names, citations, and jurisdictions.

- "# Cir." = United States Court of Appeals
  - e.g., "3d Cir." = United States Court of Appeals for the Third Circuit
- "C.C.D." = United States Circuit Court for the District of . . .
  - e.g.,"C.C.D.N.J." = United States Circuit Court for the District of New Jersey
- "D." = United States District Court for the District of . . .
  - e.g.,"D. Mass." = United States District Court for the District of Massachusetts
- "E." = Eastern; "M." = Middle; "N." = Northern; "S." = Southern; "W." = Western
  - e.g.,"C.C.S.D.N.Y." = United States Circuit Court for the Southern District of New York
  - e.g.,"M.D. Ala." = United States District Court for the Middle District of Alabama
- "Ct. Cl." = United States Court of Claims
- The abbreviation of a state's name alone indicates the highest appellate court in that state's judiciary at the time.
  - e.g.,"Pa." = Supreme Court of Pennsylvania
  - e.g.,"Me." = Supreme Judicial Court of Maine

== List of cases in volume 209 U.S. ==
Case Name	Page & year	Opinion of the Court	Concurring opinion(s)	Dissenting opinion(s)	Lower Court	Disposition
White-Smith Music Publishing Company v. Apollo Company	1 (1908)	Day	Holmes	none	2d Cir.	affirmed
Dun v. Lumbermen's Credit Association	20 (1908)	Moody	none	none	7th Cir.	affirmed
Venner v. Great Northern Railroad Company	24 (1908)	Moody	none	none	C.C.S.D.N.Y.	affirmed
Battle v. United States	36 (1908)	Holmes	none	none	C.C.S.D. Ga.	affirmed
United States v. Thayer	39 (1908)	Holmes	none	none	N.D. Tex.	reversed
O'Reilly de Camara v. Brooke	45 (1908)	Holmes	none	none	S.D.N.Y.	affirmed
Smith v. Rainey	53 (1908)	Holmes	none	none	Sup. Ct. Terr. Ariz.	reversed
Armour Packing Company v. United States	56 (1908)	Day	none	Brewer	8th Cir.	affirmed
Chicago, Burlington and Quincy Railroad Company v. United States	90 (1908)	Day	none	none	8th Cir.	affirmed
Bosque v. United States	91 (1908)	Fuller	none	none	Phil.	affirmed
Hallowell v. United States	101 (1908)	Harlan	none	none	8th Cir.	dismissed
Interstate Commerce Commission v. Chicago Great Western Railway Company	108 (1908)	Brewer	none	none	C.C.N.D. Ill.	affirmed
Ex parte Young	123 (1908)	Peckham	none	Harlan	C.C.D. Minn.	habeas corpus denied
Hunter v. Wood	205 (1908)	Peckham	none	Harlan	C.C.W.D.N.C.	affirmed
General Oil Company v. Crain	211 (1908)	McKenna	Harlan	Moody	Tenn.	affirmed
Dotson v. Milliken	237 (1908)	Holmes	none	none	D.C. Cir.	affirmed
Hutchins v. Munn	246 (1908)	Moody	none	none	D.C. Cir.	affirmed
Asbell v. Kansas	251 (1908)	Moody	none	none	Kan.	affirmed
Thomas v. Iowa	258 (1908)	Moody	none	none	Iowa	dismissed
Lipphard v. Humphrey	264 (1908)	Fuller	none	none	D.C. Cir.	affirmed
McCabe and Steen Construction Company v. Wilson	275 (1908)	Brewer	none	none	Sup. Ct. Terr. Okla.	affirmed
Garzot v. De Rubio	283 (1908)	White	none	none	D.P.R.	reversed
United States Fidelity and Guaranty Company v. United States ex rel. Struthers Wells Company	306 (1908)	Peckham	none	none	2d Cir.	affirmed
National Life Insurance Company v. National Life Insurance Company	317 (1908)	Peckham	none	none	7th Cir.	affirmed
Allemannia Fire Insurance Company v. Firemen's Insurance Company ex rel. Wolfe	326 (1908)	Peckham	none	none	D.C. Cir.	affirmed
United States v. Cerecedo Hermanos y Compañia	337 (1908)	McKenna	none	none	D.P.R.	reversed
Thompson v. Kentucky	340 (1908)	McKenna	none	none	Ky.	affirmed
Hudson County Water Company v. McCarter	349 (1908)	Holmes	none	none	N.J.	affirmed
Yazoo and Mississippi Valley Railroad Company v. City of Vicksburg	358 (1908)	Day	none	none	C.C.S.D. Miss.	affirmed
Richardson v. Shaw	365 (1908)	Day	Holmes	none	2d Cir.	affirmed
Thomas v. Taggart	385 (1908)	Day	none	none	2d Cir.	affirmed
Beadles v. Smyser	393 (1908)	Day	none	none	Sup. Ct. Terr. Okla.	reversed
Ware and Leland v. Mobile County	405 (1908)	Day	none	none	Ala.	affirmed
Longyear v. Toolan	414 (1908)	Moody	none	none	Mich.	affirmed
Stickney v. Kelsey	419 (1908)	Moody	none	none	N.Y. County Sur. Ct.	dismissed
Shawnee Compress Company v. Anderson	423 (1908)	McKenna	none	none	Sup. Ct. Terr. Okla.	affirmed
Ex parte Nebraska	436 (1908)	Fuller	none	none	C.C.D. unspecified	mandamus denied
United States v. Chandler-Dunbar Water Power Company	447 (1908)	Holmes	none	none	6th Cir.	affirmed
Liu Hop Fong v. United States	453 (1908)	Day	none	none	D. Neb.	reversed
Bogard v. Sweet	464 (1908)	Harlan	none	none	Sup. Ct. Terr. Okla.	affirmed
Lang v. New Jersey	467 (1908)	McKenna	none	none	N.J.	affirmed
Central Railroad Company of New Jersey v. Jersey City	473 (1908)	Holmes	none	none	N.J.	affirmed
Scully v. Bird	481 (1908)	McKenna	none	none	C.C.E.D. Mich.	reversed
In re Moore	490 (1908)	Brewer	none	Fuller	C.C.E.D. Mo.	mandamus denied
Virginia v. West Virginia	514 (1908)	Fuller	none	none	original	referred to special master

== See also ==
- Certificate of division
