= Ware & Leland v. Mobile County =

- Supreme Court of the United States

Argued March 10, 1908 Decided April 8, 1908
- Full case name: Ware & Leland, a Copartnership, and J. H. Ware, E. F. Leland, Charles W. Lee, and F. J. Fahey v. Mobile County and the State of Alabama
- Citations: 209 U.S. 405 (more) 28 S. Ct. 526; 52 L. Ed. 855; 14 Ann. Cas. 1031

Case history
- Prior: Judgment for defendants.

Holding
- Contracts for the sales of cotton for future delivery which do not oblige interstate shipments are not subjects of interstate commerce, and that a state tax on persons engaged in buying and selling cotton for future delivery was held not to be a regulation of interstate commerce or beyond the power of the state.

Court membership
- Chief Justice Melville Fuller Associate Justices John M. Harlan · David J. Brewer; Edward D. White · Rufus W. Peckham; Joseph McKenna · Oliver W. Holmes Jr. William R. Day · William H. Moody

Case opinion
- Majority: Day, joined by unanimous

Laws applied
- US Constitution Article I, Sec. 8.

Ware & Leland v. Mobile County, 209 U.S. 405 (1908), is a case in which the United States Supreme Court held that contracts for the sales of cotton for future delivery that do not oblige interstate shipments are not subjects of interstate commerce. The Court also held that a state tax on persons engaged in buying and selling cotton for future delivery was not a regulation of interstate commerce, and that the imposition of the tax was not beyond the power of the state.

== See also ==
- Hartsville Oil Mill v. United States: military cotton contracts
- Southern Pacific Terminal Co. v. ICC: appeals on cotton shipments
- List of United States Supreme Court cases on commodity and futures regulation
