= Southern Pacific Terminal Co. v. ICC =

- Supreme Court of the United States

Argued December 9, 1910 Decided February 20, 1911
- Full case name: Southern Pacific Terminal Co. v. Interstate Commerce Commission
- Citations: 219 U.S. 498 (more) 31 S. Ct. 279; 55 L. Ed. 310; 1911 U.S. LEXIS 1650

Case history
- Prior: Appeal from the Circuit Court of the United States for the Southern District of Texas

Court membership
- Chief Justice Edward D. White Associate Justices John M. Harlan · Joseph McKenna; Oliver W. Holmes Jr. · William R. Day; Horace H. Lurton · Charles E. Hughes; Willis Van Devanter · Joseph R. Lamar

Case opinion
- Majority: McKenna, joined by unanimous

Laws applied
- U.S. Const.

Southern Pacific Terminal Co. v. ICC, 219 U.S. 498 (1911), was a United States Supreme Court decision that held that while normally, in order for the court to hear a case, there must still be a controversy outstanding, when the issue was such that it would be of short duration, and would most likely become moot before appellate review could take place, and that the issue was likely to reoccur, then the court could hear the issue.

== Issue ==
A division of the Southern Pacific Railroad was aiding a cottonseed exporter in the Port of Galveston by negotiating discount wharf fees on his behalf in exchange for requiring farmers to haul the crop exclusively in Southern Pacific railcars. When the Interstate Commerce Commission challenged the arrangement as anti-competitive, the contract was terminated but the ICC felt similar product tying would reoccur once the case was dismissed as moot.

== The court's decision ==
The court referred to this condition as,

The case is not moot where interests of a public character are asserted by the Government under conditions that may be immediately repeated, merely because the particular order involved has expired... The rule that this court will only determine actual controversies, and will dismiss if events have transpired pending appeal which render it impossible to grant the appellant effectual relief does not apply to an appeal involving [a government] order .. merely because that order has expired. Such orders are usually continuing and capable of repetition, and their consideration, and the determination of the right of the Government and the carriers to redress, should not be defeated on account of the shortness of their term.

This condition, known as "capable of repetition, yet evading review," has allowed the court to take cases which it otherwise would be unable to decide upon, because the appellant would otherwise have no grounds to appeal. This issue has become important in a number of areas including First Amendment cases involving press coverage of trials, and to statutes involving abortion.

== See also ==
- Hartsville Oil Mill v. United States: military cotton contracts
- Ware & Leland v. Mobile County: federal jurisdiction on cotton futures
- List of United States Supreme Court cases, volume 219
