= Isidor Philipp =

French pianist, composer and pedagogue (1863–1958)

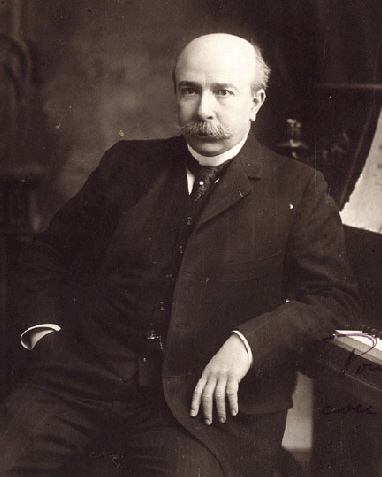
- Isidor Philipp ca. 1910
- Born: 2 September 1863; Budapest, Austrian Empire
- Died: 20 February 1958 (aged 94); Paris, France
- Citizenship: France
- Occupations: Composer and Pedagogue

Isidor Edmond Philipp (first name sometimes spelled Isidore) (2 September 1863 – 20 February 1958) was a French pianist, composer, and pedagogue of Jewish Hungarian descent. He was born in Budapest and died in Paris.

== Biography ==
Isidor Philipp was a child prodigy at the piano in his Hungarian homeland. When he was old enough, friends and family raised money for him to study piano at the professional level at the Conservatoire de Paris, regarded as the finest music conservatory in Europe. There, he studied piano under Georges Mathias (a pupil of Frédéric Chopin and Friedrich Kalkbrenner) at the Conservatoire de Paris and upon graduation won First Prize in piano performance in 1883. Other teachers included Camille Saint-Saëns, Stephen Heller (a pupil of Carl Czerny, one of Beethoven's students) and Théodore Ritter (a pupil of Franz Liszt). At the Conservatoire, he met fellow student Claude Debussy. They remained lifelong friends, and Philipp not only played his piano works in public, but consulted with Debussy on how best to notate them so that pianists would understand Debussy's intentions. As a result, Philipp was regarded as the leading authority on Debussy's piano music after his death.

After graduating from the Conservatoire, and made his first appearance at the Philharmonic Society in London in March, 1890. Philipp commenced a career which took him to various European countries, and he was a regular performer at the Colonne, Lamoureux and Conservatoire concerts in Paris. He was able to hear concerts, recitals or master classes by many of the leading pianists of the day, including Liszt and Anton Rubinstein. He knew Charles-Valentin Alkan, a close friend of Chopin's, and was a pall-bearer at Alkan's funeral in 1888; he subsequently edited many of Alkan's works for republication.

In 1890 Philipp formed a trio with violinist Loeb and cellist Bertelier which toured for about a decade. He revived the Société des Instruments à Vent from 1896 to 1901. However, he eventually curtailed his concertizing, as he found lasting satisfaction in teaching. He returned to the Conservatoire de Paris, where he was a preeminent professor of piano from 1893 to 1934, one of the youngest ever appointed to that institution, serving as chair of the piano department for much of that time. From 1921 to 1933, Philipp was also the head of the piano section at the American Conservatory of Fontainebleau, which became famous for starting the careers of many notable American composers.

His home in Paris contained many ancient and unusual instruments and other musical artifacts. When the Nazis entered Paris in World War II and Philipp fled to the United States in 1940, the Nazis confiscated the contents of his apartment and they were never recovered.

He left for the United States in 1941 and taught in New York and L'Alliance Francais in Louiseville, Quebec, Canada. During the war, he taught piano in New York City and at the Conservatoire de musique du Québec à Montréal. While he was in New York, he gave recitals with the violinist John Corigliano Sr. (Corigliano was the longtime concertmaster of the New York Philharmonic). After the war, he spent the rest of his life between New York City and Paris.

Philipp married Stell Anderson, and dedicated his Caprice to her. However, they divorced shortly afterwards.

On 20 March 1955, aged 91, he played the piano part in both Saint-Saëns' D minor Sonata and César Franck's Violin Sonata in New York, returning to Paris a year later. He gave his farewell recital at the age of 92, in Paris. He died there in 1958 after a fall on the Paris métro. He is buried in Père Lachaise Cemetery.

In 1977, the Isidor Philipp Archives were deposited at the University of Louisville by the American Liszt Society, and are currently housed in the Dwight Anderson Music Library. The Music Library was named after Anderson, who studied piano with Philipp. They gather his compositions for the piano, his exercises and studies, his editions of the works of Franz Liszt, as well as exercises, studies and works on other composers, recordings, correspondence, photographs, and other artifacts.

== The Chopin tradition ==
Philipp began piano lessons with George Mathias at age 16. In an interview with E.H. Lampard, a columnist for the St. Catharine's Standard, Harold Bradley, who was a student and associate of Philipp's for over 30 years, stated that it was Mathias who had been the one student of Chopin who absorbed all the wisdom and value in piano pedagogy that Chopin had developed over his life. "Chopin's fame as a composer has obscured the fact that he was the first and greatest name to adopt the career of piano teaching as a profession. He created an entirely new philosophy of musical thinking, and was the first musician of sufficient stature to be able to penetrate into the thought of the keyboard composers who preceded him to the extent of seeing the individual merits of each. Thus, he extended the dimensions of piano teaching to a point where the whole concept of music education became affected."

As most of Chopin's students were amateurs, or died early, Mathias was the only one who could pass on this legacy. (Mathias would later write a preface to one of Philipp's books on technique). Bradley continued, "This is not to be confused with the mere performance of Chopin's own compositions, but an appreciation of the art of the keyboard composers up to his time and the genius to apply this knowledge. At Chopin's death, it was Mathias who was able to furnish information for the complete publication of his compositions but he also felt an obligation to preserve the contribution Chopin had made as a teacher and artist. Mathias in turn trained young pianists, but it proved to be Isidor Philipp that was best equipped to carry on the Chopin philosophy of teaching. Philipp then worked with Mathias that the latter had worked with Chopin. By the age of 30, because of his studies Mathias and other prominent teachers, Philipp was recognized as the supreme authority on the piano and its literature."

== Association with Claude Debussy ==
Philipp was one of the earliest and most important interpreters of Debussy’s piano works. He not only performed them but also helped bring them to a wider audience, both through concerts and teaching. Philipp worked directly with Debussy in editing some of his piano music for publication. For example, the Durand editions of Debussy’s works often include fingerings and technical suggestions by Philipp, done with the composer’s approval. Debussy dedicated some pieces to Philipp or collaborated with him closely enough that Philipp’s influence and technical input were considered during the final stages of publication. Notably, Philipp was trusted with shaping the pedagogical and performative aspects of Debussy’s piano music. In a letter, Debussy once referred to Philipp as “un homme admirable pour faire jouer les autres” — “an admirable man for making others play.”

One of the most notable examples of Isidor Philipp’s collaboration with Claude Debussy is “Children’s Corner” (1908) — a six-movement suite for solo piano that Debussy composed and dedicated to his daughter, Claude-Emma (“Chouchou”).

Editing and Fingerings:

Debussy entrusted Isidor Philipp with editing the piano score of Children’s Corner for its first publication by Durand. Philipp provided fingerings, technical markings, and performance guidance, which were included in the published version with Debussy’s full approval.

This was more than a routine editing job — Debussy recognized Philipp’s technical brilliance and musical insight. Philipp had a knack for understanding how to make technically difficult passages more accessible to pianists without compromising the music’s character.

Pedagogical Value:

Philipp’s involvement helped ensure the suite would be both artistically faithful and pedagogically valuable. Because Children’s Corner is often used in teaching today, many pianists indirectly study Philipp’s interpretive suggestions when they learn this music.

Philipp’s Performance of Debussy’s Works:

Philipp frequently performed Children’s Corner and other Debussy works in public, helping promote them at a time when Debussy’s new harmonic language was still controversial in some circles.

== Teaching philosophy ==
In interviews his students remember him with a great deal of affection and remark about his gentle and patient manner as a teacher. Students commented that he stressed suppleness, firmness, rhythmic exactitude and articulation. He insisted on practicing with the metronome, first slowly, then incrementally faster for all technical exercises and in learning any new piece. He taught that octaves should be played from the wrist, with a motionless arm, and that fingers should attain true independence of one another. Like other great teachers, he did not have a 'system', but taught what the student needed at the time. Paul Loyonnet stated his ideals were velocity, sobriety of expression and the jeu perle style. As for interpretations, he stressed that the student must know the piece intimately and thoroughly before it can be properly played, but did not force any particular interpretation.

Philipp's repertoire was wide, from the earliest keyboard masters to contemporary composers. He believed that every pianist should be conversant in all styles and eras of piano, and did not shy from playing Bach or other early composers on a modern grand. One of his teaching points was that pianists should play any piece of music the way the composer intended, and seeking out what the composer intended is often a lifelong process. Nonetheless, each pianist should have his own views on the pieces and not just copy what another has done.

Philipp wrote, "The quality most desirable in piano playing is tone. Tone should be worked at from the first, and the pupil must listen attentively to it. To produce a beautiful tone, Thalberg said, 'one should in a way knead the keyboard with a hand of velvet, the key being rather felt than struck.' It is essential to maintain the utmost relaxation in the arms, wrists and hands." Fernando Laires said that Philipp insisted that the music and the tone should arise from deep within the piano, not pounded out at the keyboard, and by that he meant that he must come deep within one's soul, not at the fingertips.

Rubato, Philipp wrote, does not mean playing out of time, but rather, "any ritenuto that we may be impelled to make, must be compensated by a corresponding accelerando and also the opposite, the bass keeping exactly the time." Although Philipp abhorred distortions in interpreting pieces, he believed that "even when all the interpretive signs are exactly observed, there remains ample scope for self expression and liberty. You must be living and feeling the drama or the poem or the piece you play, in all its inflections and shades of emotion. What you do not feel yourself, your listeners will not get. You must be fully absorbed in the interpretation."

When his friend Claude Debussy was composing new pieces for the piano, he would often ask Philipp for advice on notation so that pianists would be able to better understand his nuances and approach. After considerable deliberation, they both decided that almost no pedal markings should be used in any of the published pieces. Their reasoning is that every piano is different in quality, every room or hall is different in size and resonance, and each pianist has different capabilities. To lock in one form of pedaling to cover all possible circumstances would place the pedaling notation above the effects that Debussy wished to achieve. They decided that pedaling only where it is absolutely necessary, and gave discretion to the pianist to use it as needed. Although this has often been abused by some pianists who use it to cloud the harmonies, or achieve a very dry sound, it remains a point of discussion for every pianist who chooses to perform Debussy's piano works.

Harold Bradley (pianist) stated that Philipp did not necessarily always take the 'best' students as his pupils. Sometimes, he would accept a student who had only a few years of instruction and was at the intermediate level, and often he would refuse to teach even top level pianists. For Philipp, the most important attribute of a student wasn't his or her particular level of accomplishment, but whether they were teachable or not. Bradley said that Philipp could often tell a pianist's personality just by listening to him play. Bradley created an institute (Bradley Institute of Music) that embodied the educational philosophies of Isidor Philipp. The institute's staff worked closely with Philipp to create a musical education that worked from pre-school aged children on.

== Association, students and friends ==
Philipp allowed his name to be associated with the Bradley Institute for Music Education Research, Ltd., which was founded in Paris, in 1930, but moved to Niagara Falls, Ontario, Canada, under the guidance of his pupil Harold Bradley. The Institute was devoted not only to teaching music, but also to documenting the vast knowledge of teaching traditions that Philipp had learned during his long life. Philipp's friend, violinist John Corigliano Sr., was among the original Board of Directors. Pianist Grace Barnes and violinist Deryck Aird served as music teachers along with Bradley for several decades.

The list of Isidor Philipp's students who became notable pianists, composers or conductors is very long, and includes Stell Andersen, Dwight Anderson, Grace Barnes, Emma Boynet, Harold Bradley, John Buttrick, Ellen Gilberg, Marcel Ciampi, Serge Conus, Aaron Copland, Jeanne-Marie Darré, Pierre Dervaux, Ania Dorfmann, Rolande Falcinelli, Felix Fox, Jean Françaix, Norman Fraser, Henri Gagnon, Florence Parr Gere, Youra Guller, Grace Hofheimer, Georges Hugon, Fernando Laires, Malvina Leshock, Yvonne Loriod, Nikita Magaloff, Federico Mompou, Léo-Pol Morin, Guiomar Novaes, Ozan Marsh, Wilfrid Pelletier, Émile Poillot, Gray Perry, Harrison Potter, noted philosopher Albert Schweitzer, Phyllis Sellick, Soulima Stravinsky, Louise Talma, Alexander Tcherepnin, Dorothy Wanderman, Mabel Madison Watson, Beveridge Webster, and Victor Young. Rena Kyriakou (Christina Giannelou)

Additionally, many prominent and well established pianists would seek out his advice, particularly on playing French composers, which included Claude Debussy. Philipp often championed new music throughout his long life, and would frequently edit the works of contemporary composers, such as Sergei Prokofiev and Maurice Ravel. He was close friends with many of the leading pianists and composers of his day, including Leopold Godowsky, Ferruccio Busoni, Josef Hofmann, Ignacy Jan Paderewski, Alfred Cortot, Lazare-Lévy, Emile-Robert Blanchet, Béla Bartók, Nadia Boulanger, Jules Massenet, Cécile Chaminade, Gabriel Fauré and Charles-Marie Widor.

Philipp taught piano to Igor Stravinsky and his son Soulima, and Stravinsky practiced the exercises from the Complete School of Technique almost daily. Contemporary commentators have noted that influence of these exercises on Stravinsky's compositions is clear.

Pianist Rudolf Serkin said that not having studied with Philipp was one of the regrets of his life. Later, he knew several of Philipp's students in Vienna, and said 'all of them were brilliant.'

The University of Louisville Isidor Philipp Archive is held at the Dwight Anderson Music Library in Louisville, Kentucky.

== Compositions, piano editions and recordings ==
His compositions include Rêverie mélancolique and Sérénade humoristique for orchestra, a concertino for three pianos (which has been recently performed in the USA), The Fantasmagories Suite, Suite for Two Pianos, 6 Concert Studies after Chopin's Études, Concert Étude after Chopin's Minute Waltz, 2 Valse-Caprices on Themes of Schubert, 4 Valse-Caprices on themes of Strauss, and arrangements and transcriptions such as the Scherzo from Felix Mendelssohn's A Midsummer Night's Dream for two pianos, and a large number of works by Bach transcribed for one or two pianos. His composition Feux-Follets (from "Pastels For Piano", no. 3) was recorded by his pupil Guiomar Novaes, a Brazilian pianist. He wrote a considerable number of transcriptions for the left hand. Philipp's compositions and transcriptions often require a high degree of finger dexterity and lightness of touch, and he liked to work in rapid successions of double thirds, fourths and octaves in many of his pieces.

Leopold Godowsky's Suite for the Left Hand and Pierre Augiéras' Twenty-five Studies for the left Hand alone were dedicated to Isidor Philipp. Philipp is best known for his technical exercises and educational works. Additionally, he published an anthology of French music from the 17th century to the end of the 19th. He was a regular contributor to The Étude, Le Ménéstral, The Musician, and Le Courrier Musical magazines, and published several short books on technique, including "Some Thoughts on Piano Playing." He is probably best known for his publication of "The Complete School of Piano Technique", published by Theodore Presser.

He also edited music by Albéniz, Alkan, Bizet, Chabrier, Chaminade, Couperin, Debussy, Delibes, Dvořák, Fauré, Franck, Godard, Gouvy, d'Indy, Kabalevsky, Khachaturian, Lully, Massenet, Mozart, Pierné, Prokofiev, Pugno, Rachmaninoff, Rameau, Ravel, Saint-Saëns, Scarlatti, Schumann, Widor, and others. Most of these edited works, especially the piano concertos, remain the standard interpretations today and have not been improved upon or updated.

Philipp recorded several works by his teacher Saint-Saëns: these include chamber music and the Scherzo for two pianos, with his assistant Marcelle Herrenschmidt (1895–1974). Additionally, he recorded the Saint-Saëns Violin Sonata No. 1 and Cello Sonatas Nos. 1 and 2 for the Pearl label, as well as a collection of his own pieces and works of Italian masters of the renaissance. There exists a recording of Philipp playing the piano in the Bach 5th Brandenburg Concerto, which aired by the NBC Symphony Orchestra in the early 1930s and was made by recording off the radio. Philipp played the Mozart Piano Concerto No. 19 in F major, K 459 with the Pro Musica Orchestra, Jean-Baptiste Mari conductor.

Philipp can be heard playing Saint-Saëns' Violin Sonata in D minor, Op. 75 Additionally, the first movement of Mozart's Piano Concerto No. 19 in F major, K. 459 can be heard, which is likely a radio broadcast made when he was 90 years old. He also recorded with Marcelle Herrenschmidt Saint-Saëns' Scherzo for Two Pianos, Op. 87.
