= Raymond Smullyan =

American mathematician and logician (1919–2017)

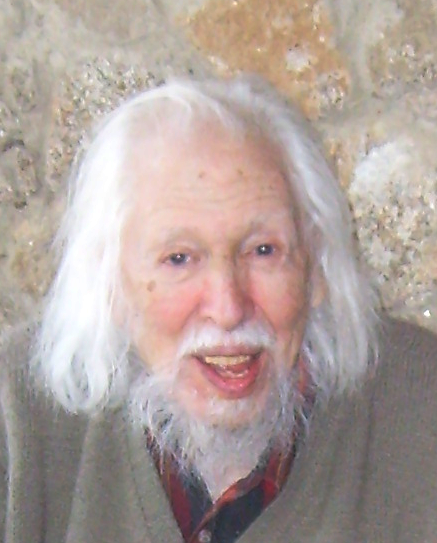
- Raymond M. Smullyan in 2008
- Born: Raymond Merrill Smullyan; May 25, 1919; Far Rockaway, New York, U.S.
- Died: February 6, 2017 (aged 97); Hudson, New York, U.S.
- Citizenship: American
- Education: University of Chicago; Princeton University (PhD)
- Spouse: Blanche
- Scientific career
- Fields: Logic
- Workplaces: Dartmouth College, Princeton University, Yeshiva University, Lehman College, City University of New York, Indiana University
- Thesis: Theory of Formal Systems (1959)
- Doctoral advisor: Alonzo Church
- Doctoral students: Melvin Fitting; Henry Pogorzelski

Raymond Merrill Smullyan (/ˈsmʌliən/; May 25, 1919 – February 6, 2017) was an American mathematician, magician, concert pianist, logician, Taoist, and philosopher.

Born in Far Rockaway, New York, Smullyan's first career choice was in stage magic. He earned a BSc from the University of Chicago in 1955 and his PhD from Princeton University in 1959. Smullyan is one of many logicians to have studied with Alonzo Church.

== Life ==
Smullyan was born on May 25, 1919, in Far Rockaway, Queens, New York, to an Ashkenazi Jewish family. His father was Isidore Smullyan, a Russian-born businessman who emigrated to Belgium when young and graduated from the Saint-Ignatius College of Commerce, his native language being French. His mother was Rosina Smullyan (née Freeman), a painter and actress born and raised in London. Both parents were musical, his father playing the violin and his mother playing the piano. Smullyan was the youngest of three children. His eldest brother, Emile Benoit Smullyan, later became an economist under the name of Emile Benoit. His sister was Gladys Smullyan, later Gladys Gwynn. His cousin was the philosopher Arthur Francis Smullyan (1912–1998). In Far Rockaway he was a grade school classmate of Richard Feynman.

Smullyan showed musical talent from a young age, playing both violin and piano. He studied with pianist Grace Hofheimer in New York. He had perfect pitch. He started his interest in logic at the age of 5. In 1931 he won a gold medal in the piano competition of the New York Music Week Association when he was aged 12 (the previous year he had won the silver medal). After graduating from grade school, the Depression forced his family to move to Manhattan, and he attended Theodore Roosevelt High School in The Bronx. He played violin in the school orchestra but devoted more time to playing the piano. At high school he fell in love with mathematics when he took a class in geometry. Apart from his classes in geometry, physics, and chemistry, however, he was dissatisfied with his high school, and dropped out. Smullyan studied mathematics on his own, including analytic geometry, calculus, and modern higher algebra – particularly group theory and Galois theory. He sat in on a course taught by Ernest Nagel at Columbia University that was being taken by his cousin, Arthur Smullyan, and independently discovered Boolean rings. He also spent a year at the Cambridge Rindge and Latin School. Smullyan did not graduate with a high school diploma, but he took the College Board exams to get into college. He studied mathematics and music at Pacific University in Oregon for one semester, and at Reed College for less than a semester, before following the pianist Bernhard Abramowitsch to San Francisco. Smullyan audited classes at the University of California, Berkeley, before returning to New York, where he continued his independent study of modern abstract algebra. At this time he composed a number of chess problems which were published many years later; he also learned magic.

At the age of 24, Smullyan enrolled at the University of Wisconsin-Madison for three semesters, because he wanted to study modern algebra with a professor whose book he had read. He later transferred to the University of Chicago and majored in mathematics. After a break in which he worked as a magician in New York and met his first wife, he returned to the University of Chicago, where he also worked as a magician at night and taught piano on the faculty at Roosevelt University. While at Chicago he took three courses with the philosopher Rudolf Carnap, for which he wrote three term papers. Carnap recommended that he send the first term paper to Willard Van Orman Quine, which he did. Quine replied that he should tinker with his idea about what makes quantification theory tick. Of the other two term papers, one, entitled "Languages in Which Self Reference is Possible" (which Carnap showed to Kurt Gödel), was later published in 1957. The other was later published in his 1961 book Theory of Formal Systems. While still a student at the University of Chicago, on the basis of a recommendation from Carnap, he was hired by John G. Kemeny, the chair of the mathematics department at Dartmouth College. Smullyan taught at Dartmouth for two years. During that time he separated from his first wife, from whom he later divorced. He also used to visit his friends Gloria and Marvin Minsky (Gloria Minsky was his cousin) in Cambridge, Massachusetts. The University of Chicago, after a battle between the faculty and administration, agreed to award Smullyan a bachelor of science degree in mathematics in 1955 based partly on courses he had taught at Dartmouth (although he had not taken them at Chicago). Both Carnap and Kemeny helped him to get accepted to the graduate program in mathematics at Princeton University. He received a PhD in mathematics from Princeton University in 1959. He completed his doctoral dissertation, titled "Theory of formal systems", under the supervision of Alonzo Church, which was published in 1961. While a graduate student at Princeton he met his second wife, Blanche, a pianist and teacher, born in Belgium, to whom he was married for 48 years until she died in 2006.

While a PhD student, Smullyan published a term paper written for one of Rudolf Carnap’s courses, “Languages in Which Self-Reference Is Possible,” in the Journal of Symbolic Logic in 1957, demonstrating that Gödelian incompleteness applies to formal systems far more elementary than those considered in Kurt Gödel’s 1931 landmark paper. The contemporary understanding of Gödel's theorem dates from this paper. Smullyan later made a compelling case that much of the fascination with Gödel's theorem should be directed at Tarski's theorem, which is much easier to prove and equally disturbing philosophically.

After getting his PhD from Princeton, he taught at Princeton for two years. He subsequently taught at New York University, at the State University of New York at New Paltz, at Smith College, and at the Belfer Graduate School of Science at Yeshiva University, before becoming professor of mathematics and computer science at Lehman College in the Bronx, where he taught undergraduate students from 1968 to 1984. He was also a professor of philosophy at the CUNY Graduate Center from 1976 to 1984, where he taught graduate students. He was subsequently a professor of philosophy at Indiana University, where he taught both undergraduate and graduate students. He was also an amateur astronomer, using a six-inch reflecting telescope for which he ground the mirror. Fellow mathematician Martin Gardner was a close friend.

Smullyan wrote many books about recreational mathematics and recreational logic. Most notably, one is titled What Is the Name of This Book?. His A Beginner's Further Guide to Mathematical Logic, published in 2017, was his final book.

== Logic problems ==
Many of Smullyan's logic problems are extensions of classic puzzles. Knights and Knaves involves knights (who always tell the truth) and knaves (who always lie). This is based on a story of two doors and two guards, one who lies and one who tells the truth. One door leads to heaven and one to hell, and the puzzle is to find out which door leads to heaven by asking one of the guards a question. One way to do this is to ask, "Which door would the other guard say leads to hell?". Unfortunately, this fails, as the liar can answer, "He would say the door to paradise leads to hell", and the truth-teller would answer, "He would say the door to paradise leads to hell." You must point at one of the doors as well as simply stating a question. For example, as philosopher Richard Turnbull has explained, you could point at either door and ask, "Will the other guard say this is the door to paradise?" The truth-teller will say "No, " if it is in fact the door to paradise, as will the liar. So you pick that door. The truth-teller will answer "Yes," if it is the door to Hell, as will the liar, so you pick the other door. Note also that we are not told anything about the goals of either guard: for all we know, the liar may want to help us and the truth-teller not help us, or both are indifferent, so there's no reason to think either one will phrase answers such as to provide us with the most optimally available kind of comprehension. This is behind the crucial role of actually pointing at a door directly while asking the question. This idea was famously used in the 1986 film Labyrinth.

In more complex puzzles, he introduces characters who may lie or tell the truth (referred to as "normals"), and furthermore instead of answering "yes" or "no", use words which mean "yes" or "no", but the reader does not know which word means which. The puzzle known as "the hardest logic puzzle ever" is based on these characters and themes. In his Transylvania puzzles, half of the inhabitants are insane, and believe only false things, whereas the other half are sane and believe only true things. In addition, humans always tell the truth, and vampires always lie. For example, an insane vampire will believe a false thing (2 + 2 is not 4) but will then lie about it, and say that it is false. A sane vampire knows 2 + 2 is 4, but will lie and say it is not. And mutatis mutandis for humans. Thus everything said by a sane human or an insane vampire is true, while everything said by an insane human or a sane vampire is false.

His book Forever Undecided popularizes Gödel's incompleteness theorems by phrasing them in terms of reasoners and their beliefs, rather than formal systems and what can be proved in them. For example, if a native of a knight/knave island says to a sufficiently self-aware reasoner, "You will never believe that I am a knight", the reasoner cannot believe either that the native is a knight or that he is a knave without becoming inconsistent (i.e., holding two contradictory beliefs). The equivalent theorem is that for any formal system S, there exists a mathematical statement that can be interpreted as "This statement is not provable in formal system S". If the system S is consistent, neither the statement nor its opposite will be provable in it. See also Doxastic logic.

Inspector Craig from Scotland Yard is a frequent character in Smullyan's "puzzle-novellas". He is generally called into a scene of a crime that has a solution that is mathematical in nature. Then, through a series of increasingly harder challenges, he (and the reader) begin to understand the principles in question. Finally the novella culminates in Inspector Craig (and the reader) solving the crime, utilizing the mathematical and logical principles learned. Inspector Craig generally does not learn the formal theory in question, and Smullyan usually reserves a few chapters after the Inspector Craig adventure to illuminate the analogy for the reader. Inspector Craig gets his name from William Craig.

His book To Mock a Mockingbird (1985) is a recreational introduction to the subject of combinatory logic.

Apart from writing about and teaching logic, Smullyan released a recording of his favorite baroque keyboard and classical piano pieces by composers such as Bach, Scarlatti, and Schubert. Some recordings are available on the Piano Society website, along with the video "Rambles, Reflections, Music and Readings". He has also written two autobiographical works, one entitled Some Interesting Memories: A Paradoxical Life and a later book entitled Reflections: The Magic, Music and Mathematics of Raymond Smullyan.

In 2001, documentary filmmaker Tao Ruspoli made a film about Smullyan called "This Film Needs No Title: A Portrait of Raymond Smullyan".

== Philosophy ==
Smullyan wrote several books about Taoist philosophy, a philosophy he believed neatly solved most or all traditional philosophical problems as well as integrating mathematics, logic, and philosophy into a cohesive whole. One of Smullyan's discussions of Taoist philosophy centers on the question of free will in an imagined conversation between a mortal human and God.

== Bibliography ==
=== Books ===
— (1959). Theory of formal systems (Ph.D. thesis). Thesis advisor Alonzo Church. Princeton University: Princeton University.

- — (1971) [21-April-1961]. Theory of Formal Systems (revised ed.). Princeton, NJ: Princeton University Press. ISBN 978-0-691-08047-5.
- — (1968). First-Order Logic. Ergebnisse der Mathematik und ihrer Grenzgebiete. Vol. 43 (1st edition, Second Printing 1971 ed.). New York Heidelberg Berlin: Springer-Verlag. p. 160. doi:10.1007/978-3-642-86718-7. ISBN 978-3-642-86718-7.
- — (1977). The Tao is Silent. ISBN 0060674695.
- — (1978). What Is the Name of This Book? The Riddle of Dracula and Other Logical Puzzles. ISBN 0139550623. "knights, knaves, and other logic puzzles"
- — (1979). The Chess Mysteries of Sherlock Holmes. ISBN 0394737571. "introducing retrograde analysis in the game of chess"
- — (1980). This Book Needs No Title. ISBN 0671628313.
- — (1981). The Chess Mysteries of the Arabian Knights. ISBN 0192861247. "second book on retrograde analysis chess problems"
- — (1982). Alice in Puzzle-Land. ISBN 0688007481.
- — (1982a). The Lady or the Tiger?. ISBN 0812921178. "ladies, tigers, and more logic puzzles"
- — (1983). 5000 B.C. and Other Philosophical Fantasies. ISBN 0312295162.
- — (1985). To Mock a Mockingbird: And Other Logic Puzzles Including An Amazing Adventure in Combinatory Logic. ISBN 0192801422. "puzzles based on combinatory logic"
- — (1987). Forever Undecided. ISBN 0192801414. "puzzles based on undecidability in formal systems"
- — (1992). Gödel's Incompleteness Theorems. New York: Oxford University Press. pp. XIII, 139. ISBN 0195046722., in Goble, Lou, ed. (2001) [1992]. "Gödel's Incompleteness Theorems". The Blackwell Guide to Philosophical Logic. Blackwell. ISBN 0-631-20693-0.
- — (1992a). Satan, Cantor and Infinity. ISBN 0679406883.
- — (1993). Recursion Theory for Metamathematics. ISBN 019508232X.
- — (1994). Diagonalization and Self-Reference. Oxford: Clarendon Press. pp. XV, 396. ISBN 0198534507.
- — (1996). Set Theory and the Continuum Problem. ISBN 0198523955.
- — (1997). The Riddle of Scheherazade. ISBN 0156006065.
- — (2002). Some Interesting Memories: A Paradoxical Life. Davenport, IA: Thinkers' Press. ISBN 1888710101.
- — (2003). Who Knows?: A Study of Religious Consciousness. ISBN 0253215749.
- — (2009). Logical Labyrinths. "ISBN 9781568814438, 9781439865378, 9780429064937"
- — (2009a). Rambles Through My Library. Praxis International. ISBN 9780963923165.
- — (2010). King Arthur in Search of his Dog. ISBN 9780486474359.
- — (2013). The Godelian Puzzle Book: Puzzles, Paradoxes and Proofs. ISBN 9780486497051.
- — (2014). A Beginner's Guide to Mathematical Logic. ISBN 978-0486492377.
- — (2015). The Magic Garden of George B and Other Logic Puzzles. "ISBN 9789814675055, 9789814675062, 9789814678551, 9788876990663"
- — (2015a). Reflections: The Magic, Music and Mathematics of Raymond Smullyan. Hackensack, New Jersey: World Scientific Publishing. doi:10.1142/9451. ISBN 978-981-4644-58-7.
- — (2016). A Mixed Bag: Jokes, Riddles, Puzzles and Memorabilia. ISBN 978-098-6144-57-8.
- — (2017). A Beginner's Further Guide to Mathematical Logic. New Jersey, London, Singapore, Beijing, Shanghai, Hong Kong, Taipei, Chennai, Tokyo: World Scientific Publishing. ISBN 978-981-4730-99-0.

=== Articles, columns and miscellanea ===
- — (March 1957). "Languages in Which Self Reference is Possible". Journal of Symbolic Logic. 22 (1): 55–67. doi:10.2307/2964058. JSTOR 2964058.
- — (1977). "Is God a Taoist?".
- — (1980a). "Planet Without Laughter".
- — (1982b). "An Epistemological Nightmare".
- — (February 1996). "The strange case of McSnurd". Brain Bogglers. Discover. 17 (2): 90.

== See also ==
- Alice's Adventures in Wonderland
- Coercive logic
- Cosmic Consciousness
- Paradox
- The Lady, or the Tiger
