= Corrigan v. Buckley =

Corrigan et al. v. Buckley
- Supreme Court of the United States

Argued January 8, 1926 Decided May 24, 1926
- Full case name: Corrigan et al. v. Buckley
- Citations: 271 U.S. 323 (more) 46 S. Ct. 521; 70 L. Ed. 969

Holding
- This decision dismissed any constitutional grounds for challenges racially restrictive covenants and upheld the legal right of property owners to enforce these discriminatory agreements.

Court membership
- Chief Justice William H. Taft Associate Justices Oliver W. Holmes Jr. · Willis Van Devanter; James C. McReynolds · Louis Brandeis; George Sutherland · Pierce Butler; Edward T. Sanford · Harlan F. Stone

Case opinion
- Majority: Sanford, joined by unanimous
- Overruled by
- Shelley v. Kraemer (1948)

Corrigan v. Buckley, 271 U.S. 323 (1926), was a US Supreme Court case in 1926 that ruled that the racially-restrictive covenant of multiple residents on S Street NW, between 18th Street and New Hampshire Avenue, in Washington, DC, was a legally-binding document that made the selling of a house to a black family a void contract. This ruling set the precedent upholding racially restrictive covenants in Washington; soon after this ruling, racially restrictive covenants flourished around the nation. Subsequently, in Shelley v. Kraemer (1948) the court reconsidered such covenants and found that racially restrictive covenants are unenforceable.

== Background ==
Buchanan v. Warley (1917) barred the government from enforcing segregation through explicitly racial zoning provisions. But in the aftermath of Buchanan, other less explicit methods to force and maintain segregation were created, such as racially-restrictive covenants. The covenants were documents drawn up by members of a neighborhood and stated that the signers would not sell their homes to any nonwhite person. The agreements were instituted on a private scale and so had never had to face justification from the courts. Many citizens who signed the papers were afraid of blacks moving in and lowering their property values. The whites gave numerous reasons for how the exclusion of blacks was logical and understandable. However, the reasons were used in the end as a façade to cover up the racism that was still prevalent at that time. Washington had always been a racially-segregated city, and one such covenant was signed for the block on S Street NW, between 18th Street and New Hampshire Avenue. Another tactic, exclusionary zoning, was not explicitly racial in description but maintained de facto class-based segregation and was upheld in Euclid v. Ambler (1926).

== Case ==
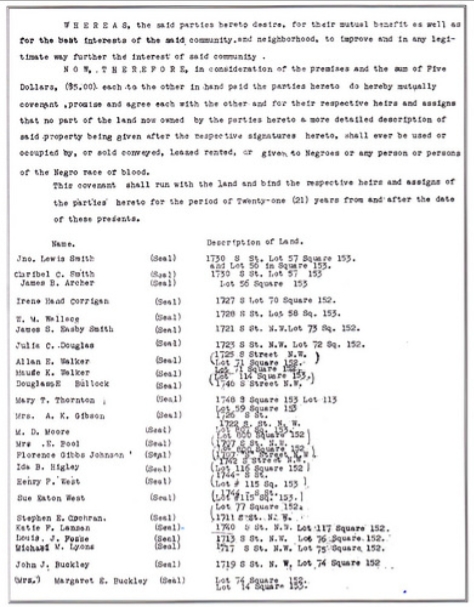
The covenant signed by John J. Buckley and Irene H. Corrigan

Corrigan v. Buckley resulted from an infringement upon a covenant. An agreement was made in 1921 by 30 white homeowners that none among them would sell, rent, or allow black people to obtain their land by any means. In 1922, Irene Corrigan broke the restrictions put in place by the covenant. Corrigan sold her land to a black couple, Helen and Dr. Arthur Curtis. Corrigan vs. Buckley went through a five-year court case before finally it was settled by the Supreme Court in 1926. Buckley and the offense hoped that since the covenant was a written and signed document, it would be considered viable in a court of law. Curtis and Corrigan "moved to dismiss the bill on the ground that the covenant deprived the negro of property without due process of law, abridged the privileges and immunities of citizens of the United States, and denied him the equal protection of the law." Corrigan and Curtis argued that not selling her house would be a violation of Curtis's civil rights, but Buckley argued that the contract was binding and that Corrigan had no right to break it.

The District Supreme Court sided with Buckley and stated that legal segregation happened all around DC and was a legal practice. The DC Court of Appeals also sided with Buckley and stated that since blacks had the ability to exclude others from their neighborhoods in which they lived, it did not discriminate against them and so did not violate Curtis's civil rights. Both courts used the landmark case of Plessy v. Ferguson, which legalized segregation if the separate races had equal facilities, to state their case.

The NAACP lawyers kept the appeals process going to the Supreme Court. They cited that the racially-restrictive covenants would "drive colored folk out of Washington." Once again, the court sided with Buckley. Justice Sanford delivered the decision: "in the absence of any substantial constitutional or statutory question giving us jurisdiction of this appeal under the provisions of section 250 of the Judicial Code, we cannot determine upon the merits the contentions earnestly pressed by the defendants in this court that the indenture is not only void because contrary to public policy, but is also of such a discriminatory character that a court of equity will not lend its aid by enforcing the specific performance of the covenant." The ruling meant that the purchase that Curtis had made on the house was now void and that the covenant was upheld.

== Aftermath ==
By upholding the dismissal of the case, the Supreme Court set the precedent that racially exclusive covenants were acceptable and not prohibited by law. That led to the spread of covenants throughout the DC area. In the years following the case, petition covenants quickly spread to many white neighborhoods in DC. Hundreds of lots signed onto petition covenants in 1927, the year after Corrigan v. Buckley. The covenants were not a federally-mandated form of segregation, and the decision in Corrigan v. Buckley seemed to take a few steps back in the progress concerning black civil rights in the United States.

One major impact of the Corrigan v. Buckley case was on the neighborhood on S Street NW, where the covenant was originally signed by Corrigan and Buckley. Buckley stopped Helen Curtis from moving into No. 1727 on S Street. However, as the court case was being fought, Dr. Emmett J. Scott, a black man, moved into No. 1711 of S Street in April 1923. That caused a very quick migration of the white community out of the neighborhood. By 1934, the neighborhood had an 86% nonwhite population. The population shift showed the extreme effect that one black person could have on a neighborhood that was almost completely inhabited by whites. Many neighborhoods shifted dramatically during this time, as many DC white people left the city for the suburbs. The "white flight," as it was coined, was often the result of a black person moving into a neighborhood that was almost completely inhabited by whites. The white people still living in those houses feared that their property values would go down dramatically unless they sold right away; they would thus move out to the suburbs as quickly as possible.

The ramifications of Corrigan v. Buckley were felt throughout the DC area. The use of covenants spread rapidly until almost entire neighborhoods were promised to be racially homogeneous. Blacks now faced the possibility of lawsuits if they used loopholes to work around the housing restrictions. Some blacks who managed to sneak past the covenants and the occasionally-racist sellers, and to move into a home would often lead to a mass exodus of whites to other areas. The precedent that racial exclusion in terms of housing was acceptable lasted for a few decades before the issue was reconsidered by the judicial system. It was only at Shelley v. Kraemer (1948) that the Supreme Court determined that it was unconstitutional for the legal system to enforce covenants. Corrigan v. Buckley set the precedent that racially restrictive covenants were just, and it lasted for years.

== See also ==
- Hansberry v. Lee (1940), a Supreme Court of the United States case which allowed renewed challenges to racial covenants
- Shelley v. Kraemer (1948), a Supreme Court of the United States case which struck down racially restrictive housing covenants
