= Emma Boynet =

French pianist

Emma Boynet (1891–1974) was a French pianist.

Emma Boynet studied with Isidor Philipp at the Paris Conservatoire, and remained closely associated with Philipp until his death. She was awarded the Medaille de Premier Prix of the Conservatoire.

She was a favourite pianist of the conductor Serge Koussevitzky and was frequently chosen by him to play with the Boston Symphony Orchestra, which he conducted.

She was especially noted as an interpreter of French music, particularly the music of Gabriel Fauré, whom she knew in his later years.
