= Landon Rabern =

American mathematician

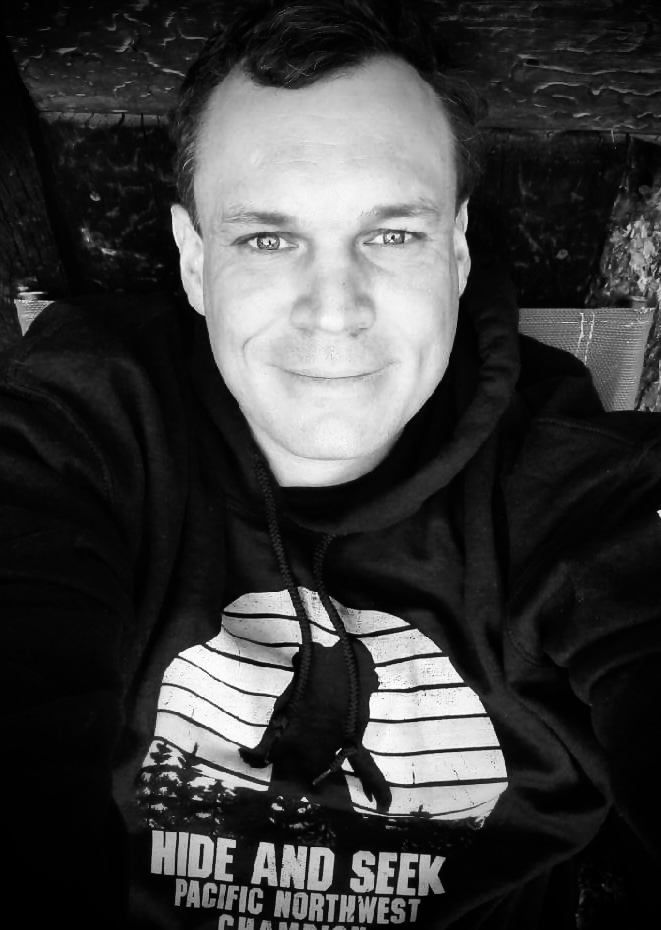
- Born: 1981; Roseburg, Oregon, United States
- Occupations: Mathematician, Computer Scientist, Software Engineer
- Known for: Graph theory, logic, artificial intelligence
- Awards: Ross Middlemiss Prize

Landon Rabern (1981–2020) was an American mathematician and computer scientist, best known for his contributions to graph theory, logic, and artificial intelligence.

His research primarily focused on problems related to graph coloring, including work on Brooks' theorem, the Borodin–Kostochka conjecture, list critical graphs, and Reed's conjecture. Rabern earned a Ph.D. in mathematics from Arizona State University in 2013, under the supervision of Hal Kierstead, with a dissertation that explored coloring graphs using nearly maximum-degree-sized palettes.

== Early life and education ==
Rabern was born and raised in Roseburg, Oregon. He developed an early interest in computers, and machine intelligence. In the 1980s, he began programming on a Commodore 64, learning languages such as BASIC, Pascal (programming language), and C (programming language). By high school, he had created a chess AI, known as "Betsy," which is credited as the first published chess engine capable of playing Fisher Random Chess.

Rabern pursued studies in mathematics and computer science at Washington University in St. Louis, with a year abroad in the Netherlands. He later earned a master's degree in mathematics from the University of California, Santa Barbara. While working as a software engineer, Rabern continued to independently explore graph theory. His proof of a conjecture in the field led him to pursue a Ph.D. at Arizona State University.

== Career and research ==
Rabern made significant contributions to graph theory, particularly in areas such as the Borodin–Kostochka conjecture, list critical graphs, and Reed's conjecture. His work in discrete mathematics and combinatorics was recognized for its rigor and creativity. Rabern's work extended beyond mathematics into computer science and philosophy. Notably, he explored the use of automated theorem proving and computer-assisted proofs in graph theory. He also made contributions to the study of semantic paradoxes (e.g., Yablo's paradox) by applying graph-theoretic methods. And in another article provided a novel (two-question) solution to "The Hardest Logic Puzzle Ever". He also contributed a satirical mathematical proof titled "A Teleological Argument" for the existence of the Flying Spaghetti Monster, published in The Gospel of the Flying Spaghetti Monster.

In addition to his academic research, Rabern had a successful career in software engineering and data science, co-founding a software company and working with several technology firms, particularly those focused on artificial intelligence and social media. In the final years of his career, Rabern returned to his early interest in artificial intelligence and chess programming. He began a second Ph.D. in Cognitive Science at the University of Colorado Boulder, where he focused on the intersection of psychology and machine learning. Rabern died in 2020 at the age of 39.
