= List of United States Supreme Court cases, volume 271 =

Supreme Court of the United States
- Interactive map of Supreme Court of the United States
- 38°53′26″N 77°00′16″W
- Established: March 4, 1789; 236 years ago
- Location: Washington, D.C.
- Coordinates: 38°53′26″N 77°00′16″W
- Composition method: Presidential nomination with Senate confirmation
- Authorised by: Constitution of the United States, Art. III, § 1
- Judge term length: life tenure, subject to impeachment and removal
- Number of positions: 9 (by statute)
- Website: supremecourt.gov

This is a list of cases reported in volume 271 of United States Reports, decided by the Supreme Court of the United States in 1926.

== Justices of the Supreme Court at the time of volume 271 U.S. ==
The Supreme Court is established by Article III, Section 1 of the Constitution of the United States, which says: "The judicial Power of the United States, shall be vested in one supreme Court . . .". The size of the Court is not specified; the Constitution leaves it to Congress to set the number of justices. Under the Judiciary Act of 1789 Congress originally fixed the number of justices at six (one chief justice and five associate justices). Since 1789 Congress has varied the size of the Court from six to seven, nine, ten, and back to nine justices (always including one chief justice).

When the cases in volume 271 were decided the Court comprised the following nine members:

| Portrait | Justice | Office | Home State | Succeeded | Date confirmed by the Senate (Vote) | Tenure on Supreme Court |
|---|---|---|---|---|---|---|
| | William Howard Taft | Chief Justice | Connecticut | Edward Douglass White | June 30, 1921 (Acclamation) | July 11, 1921 – February 3, 1930 (Retired) |
| | Oliver Wendell Holmes Jr. | Associate Justice | Massachusetts | Horace Gray | December 4, 1902 (Acclamation) | December 8, 1902 – January 12, 1932 (Retired) |
| | Willis Van Devanter | Associate Justice | Wyoming | Edward Douglass White (as Associate Justice) | December 15, 1910 (Acclamation) | January 3, 1911 – June 2, 1937 (Retired) |
| | James Clark McReynolds | Associate Justice | Tennessee | Horace Harmon Lurton | August 29, 1914 (44–6) | October 12, 1914 – January 31, 1941 (Retired) |
| | Louis Brandeis | Associate Justice | Massachusetts | Joseph Rucker Lamar | June 1, 1916 (47–22) | June 5, 1916 – February 13, 1939 (Retired) |
| | George Sutherland | Associate Justice | Utah | John Hessin Clarke | September 5, 1922 (Acclamation) | October 2, 1922 – January 17, 1938 (Retired) |
| | Pierce Butler | Associate Justice | Minnesota | William R. Day | December 21, 1922 (61–8) | January 2, 1923 – November 16, 1939 (Died) |
| | Edward Terry Sanford | Associate Justice | Tennessee | Mahlon Pitney | January 29, 1923 (Acclamation) | February 19, 1923 – March 8, 1930 (Died) |
| | Harlan F. Stone | Associate Justice | New York | Joseph McKenna | February 5, 1925 (71–6) | March 2, 1925 – July 2, 1941 (Continued as chief justice) |

== Notable Case in 271 U.S. ==
=== Corrigan v. Buckley ===
In Corrigan v. Buckley, 271 U.S. 323 (1926), the Supreme Court ruled that the racially restrictive covenant of multiple residents on S Street NW, between 18th Street and New Hampshire Avenue, in Washington, DC, was a legally-binding document that made the selling of a house to a black family a void contract. This ruling set a precedent upholding such covenants in Washington; racially restrictive covenants then flourished around the nation. It was only with Shelley v. Kraemer (1948) that the Supreme Court determined it unconstitutional for the legal system to enforce racially-restrictive covenants.

== Citation style ==
Under the Judiciary Act of 1789 the federal court structure at the time comprised District Courts, which had general trial jurisdiction; Circuit Courts, which had mixed trial and appellate (from the US District Courts) jurisdiction; and the United States Supreme Court, which had appellate jurisdiction over the federal District and Circuit courts—and for certain issues over state courts. The Supreme Court also had limited original jurisdiction (i.e., in which cases could be filed directly with the Supreme Court without first having been heard by a lower federal or state court). There were one or more federal District Courts and/or Circuit Courts in each state, territory, or other geographical region.

The Judiciary Act of 1891 created the United States Courts of Appeals and reassigned the jurisdiction of most routine appeals from the district and circuit courts to these appellate courts. The Act created nine new courts that were originally known as the "United States Circuit Courts of Appeals." The new courts had jurisdiction over most appeals of lower court decisions. The Supreme Court could review either legal issues that a court of appeals certified or decisions of court of appeals by writ of certiorari. On January 1, 1912, the effective date of the Judicial Code of 1911, the old Circuit Courts were abolished, with their remaining trial court jurisdiction transferred to the U.S. District Courts.

Bluebook citation style is used for case names, citations, and jurisdictions.

- "# Cir." = United States Court of Appeals
  - e.g., "3d Cir." = United States Court of Appeals for the Third Circuit
- "D." = United States District Court for the District of . . .
  - e.g.,"D. Mass." = United States District Court for the District of Massachusetts
- "E." = Eastern; "M." = Middle; "N." = Northern; "S." = Southern; "W." = Western
  - e.g.,"M.D. Ala." = United States District Court for the Middle District of Alabama
- "Ct. Cl." = United States Court of Claims
- The abbreviation of a state's name alone indicates the highest appellate court in that state's judiciary at the time.
  - e.g.,"Pa." = Supreme Court of Pennsylvania
  - e.g.,"Me." = Supreme Judicial Court of Maine

== List of cases in volume 271 U.S. ==
| Case Name | Page and year | Opinion of the Court | Concurring opinion(s) | Dissenting opinion(s) | Lower Court | Disposition |
|---|---|---|---|---|---|---|
| Keith v. Johnson | 1 (1926) | Butler | none | none | 2d Cir. | affirmed |
| United States v. Mitchell | 9 (1926) | Butler | none | none | Ct. Cl. | reversed |
| Mottram v. United States | 15 (1926) | Butler | none | none | Ct. Cl. | affirmed |
| Evansville and Bowling Green Packet Company v. Chero Cola Bottling Company | 19 (1926) | Butler | none | none | D. Ind. | affirmed |
| Board of Public Utility Commissioners of New Jersey v. New York Telephone Company | 23 (1926) | Butler | none | none | D.N.J. | affirmed |
| Engel v. Davenport | 33 (1926) | Sanford | none | none | Cal. | reversed |
| Missouri ex rel. Hurwitz v. North | 40 (1926) | Stone | none | none | Mo. | affirmed |
| Hartsville Oil Mill v. United States | 43 (1926) | Stone | none | none | Ct. Cl. | affirmed |
| Roberts and Schaefer Company v. Emmerson | 50 (1926) | Stone | none | none | Ill. | affirmed |
| Reading Company v. Koons | 58 (1926) | Stone | none | none | Pa. | reversed |
| Massachusetts v. New York | 65 (1926) | Stone | none | none | original | decree for N.Y. |
| Sun Ship Building Company v. United States | 96 (1926) | Taft | none | none | Ct. Cl. | multiple |
| Great Northern Railroad Company v. Galbreath Cattle Company | 99 (1926) | VanDevanter | none | none | Mont. | reversed |
| Boyd v. United States | 104 (1926) | VanDevanter | none | none | 6th Cir. | affirmed |
| New York Life Insurance Company v. Edwards | 109 (1926) | McReynolds | none | none | 2d Cir. | reversed |
| Union Insulating and Construction Company v. United States | 121 (1926) | Taft | none | none | Ct. Cl. | affirmed |
| New York Central Railroad Company v. New York and Pennsylvania Company | 124 (1926) | Holmes | none | none | Pa. | reversed |
| Venner v. Michigan Central Railroad Company | 127 (1926) | VanDevanter | none | none | N.D. Ohio | affirmed |
| Patterson v. Mobile Gas Company | 131 (1926) | McReynolds | none | none | M.D. Ala. | affirmed |
| Iselin v. United States | 136 (1926) | Taft | none | none | Ct. Cl. | affirmed |
| Early and Daniel Company v. United States | 140 (1926) | Taft | none | none | Ct. Cl. | affirmed |
| United States ex rel. Hughes v. Gault | 142 (1926) | Holmes | none | Brandeis | S.D. Iowa | affirmed |
| Colorado v. United States | 153 (1926) | Brandeis | none | none | D. Colo. | affirmed |
| Bowers v. Kerbaugh-Empire Company | 170 (1926) | Butler | none | none | S.D.N.Y. | affirmed |
| Taylor v. Voss | 176 (1926) | Sanford | none | none | 7th Cir. | reversed |
| Harrison v. Chamberlin | 191 (1926) | Sanford | none | none | 8th Cir. | affirmed |
| Hassler, Inc. v. Shaw | 195 (1926) | Holmes | none | none | E.D.S.C. | reversed |
| United States v. Noveck | 201 (1926) | Butler | none | none | S.D.N.Y. | affirmed |
| Leiter v. United States | 204 (1926) | Sanford | none | none | Ct. Cl. | affirmed |
| Booth Fisheries Company v. Industrial Relations Commission of Wisconsin | 208 (1926) | Taft | none | none | Wis. | affirmed |
| United States v. Minnesota Mutual Investment Company | 212 (1926) | Taft | none | none | D. Colo. | reversed |
| Chesapeake and Ohio Railway Company v. Nixon | 218 (1926) | Holmes | none | none | Va. | reversed |
| Virginian Railroad Company v. Mullens | 220 (1926) | VanDevanter | none | none | Wyoming County Cir. Ct. | reversed |
| General Investment Company v. New York Central Railroad Company | 228 (1926) | VanDevanter | none | none | N.D. Ohio | reversed |
| Sperry Gyroscope Company v. Arma Engineering Company | 232 (1926) | McReynolds | none | none | E.D.N.Y. | reversed |
| Mellon v. Michigan Trust Company | 236 (1926) | McReynolds | none | none | 6th Cir. | affirmed |
| Fenner v. Boykin | 240 (1926) | McReynolds | none | none | N.D. Ga. | affirmed |
| Alabama and Vicksburg Railway Company v. Jackson and Eastern Railway Company | 244 (1926) | Brandeis | none | none | Miss. | reversed |
| Chicago and Northwestern Railway Company v. Alvin R. Durham Company | 251 (1926) | Brandeis | none | none | Mich. | reversed |
| Turner, Dennis and Lowry Lumber Company v. Chicago, Milwaukee and St. Paul Railway Company | 259 (1926) | Brandeis | none | none | W.D. Mo. | affirmed |
| United States v. Wyckoff Pipe and Creosoting Company, Inc. | 263 (1926) | Brandeis | none | none | Ct. Cl. | reversed |
| Western Paper Makers' Chemical Company v. United States | 268 (1926) | Brandeis | none | none | W.D. Mich. | affirmed |
| Sutherland, Alien Property Custodian v. Mayer | 272 (1926) | Sutherland | none | none | 1st Cir. | reversed |
| Henkels v. Sutherland, Alien Property Custodian | 298 (1926) | Sutherland | none | none | 2d Cir. | reversed |
| Missouri, Kansas and Texas Railway Company v. Oklahoma | 303 (1926) | Butler | none | none | Okla. | reversed |
| United States v. Pittsburgh and West Virginia Railway Company | 310 (1926) | Butler | none | none | Ct. Cl. | reversed |
| Culver v. United States | 315 (1926) | Butler | none | none | Ct. Cl. | reversed |
| Hay v. The May Department Stores Company | 318 (1926) | Sanford | none | none | E.D. Mo. | reversed |
| Corrigan v. Buckley | 323 (1926) | Sanford | none | none | D.C. Cir. | dismissed |
| United States v. Zerbey | 332 (1926) | Sanford | none | none | 3d Cir. | certification |
| Lederer v. McGarvey | 342 (1926) | Sanford | none | none | 3d Cir. | dismissed |
| St. Louis–San Francisco Railway Company v. Mills | 344 (1926) | Stone | none | none | 5th Cir. | reversed |
| Blair v. United States ex rel. Birkenstock | 348 (1926) | Stone | none | none | D.C. Cir. | reversed |
| United States v. Katz | 354 (1926) | Stone | none | none | E.D. Pa. | affirmed |
| Appleby v. City of New York | 364 (1926) | Taft | none | none | N.Y. Sup. Ct. | reversed |
| Appleby v. Delaney | 403 (1926) | Taft | none | none | N.Y. Sup. Ct. | reversed |
| Thornton v. United States | 414 (1926) | Taft | none | none | 5th Cir. | affirmed |
| Old Colony Trust Company v. City of Seattle | 426 (1926) | VanDevanter | none | none | W.D. Wash. | reversed |
| United States v. Candelaria | 432 (1926) | VanDevanter | none | none | 8th Cir. | certification |
| Kansas City Terminal Railway Company v. Central Union Trust Company of New York | 445 (1926) | McReynolds | none | none | 8th Cir. | certification |
| Home Furniture Company v. United States | 456 (1926) | McReynolds | none | none | W.D. Texas | affirmed |
| Ex parte Buder | 461 (1926) | Brandeis | none | none | Mo. Dist. Ct. | mandamus denied |
| United States v. Ramsey | 467 (1926) | Sutherland | none | none | W.D. Okla. | reversed |
| Chicago, Milwaukee and St. Paul Railway Company v. Coogan | 472 (1926) | Butler | none | none | Minn. | reversed |
| Ma-King Products Company v. Blair | 479 (1926) | Sanford | none | none | 3d Cir. | affirmed |
| Davis v. Williford | 484 (1926) | Sanford | none | none | Okla. | affirmed |
| City of Douglas v. Federal Reserve Bank of Dallas | 489 (1926) | Stone | none | none | 5th Cir. | affirmed |
| Raffel v. United States | 494 (1926) | Stone | none | none | 6th Cir. | certification |
| Yu Cong Eng v. Trinidad | 500 (1926) | Taft | none | none | Phil. | reversed |
| Alejandrino v. Quezon | 528 (1926) | Taft | none | none | Phil. | dismissed |
| Goltra v. Weeks | 536 (1926) | Taft | none | McReynolds | 8th Cir. | affirmed |
| Steamship Northern Star | 552 (1926) | Holmes | none | McReynolds | 2d Cir. | reversed |
| Panama Railroad Company v. Vasquez | 557 (1926) | VanDevanter | none | none | N.Y. Sup. Ct. | affirmed |
| Steamship Pesaro | 562 (1926) | VanDevanter | none | none | S.D.N.Y. | affirmed |
| Lake Superior Consolidated Iron Mines v. Lord | 577 (1926) | McReynolds | none | none | D. Minn | affirmed |
| Frost and Frost Trucking Company v. Railroad Commission of California | 583 (1926) | Sutherland | none | Holmes; McReynolds | Cal. | reversed |
| Missouri Pacific Railroad Company v. United States | 603 (1926) | Sutherland | none | none | Ct. Cl. | affirmed |
| Jaybird Mining Company v. Weir | 609 (1926) | Butler | none | Brandeis | Okla. | reversed |
| Hammer v. United States | 620 (1926) | Butler | none | none | 2d Cir. | reversed |
| Arkansas v. Tennessee | 629 (1926) | Butler | none | none | original | boundary set |
| Scott v. Paisley | 632 (1926) | Sanford | none | none | Ga. | affirmed |
| Massachusetts v. New York | 636 (1926) | Holmes | none | none | original | dismissed |
