= This Book Needs No Title =

1980 essay collection by Smullyan

- First edition
- Author: Raymond Smullyan
- Language: English
- Genre: Essay collection
- Publisher: Prentice-Hall
- Publication date: 1980

This Book Needs No Title: A Budget of Living Paradoxes is a 1980 collection of essays about logic, paradoxes, and philosophy, by Raymond Smullyan. It was first published by Prentice-Hall.

In 2023, it was reissued by What Is the Name of This Press, with a new foreword by Donald Knuth.

== Reception ==
Kirkus Reviews called it "funny" and "provocative", commending Smullyan's descriptions of Zen and noting that the book could appeal to both children and adults, but conceded that Smullyan's work may be an "acquired taste".

The Washington Post has described "This Book Needs No Title" as "tantalizing", while Michael Dirda has declared that (along with Smullyan's earlier "What is the Name of this Book") it has "the cleverest of all titles", positing that Smullyan may have been inspired by Denis Diderot's "Ceci n'est pas un conte".
