= Mootness =

Legal term on the status of a matter

The terms moot, mootness and moot point are used both in English and in American law, although with significantly different meanings.

In the legal system of the United States, a matter is "moot" if further legal proceedings with regard to it can have no effect or events have placed it beyond the reach of the law, thereby depriving the matter of practical significance or rendering it purely academic.

The U.S. development of this word stems from the practice of moot courts, in which hypothetical or fictional cases were argued as a part of legal education. These purely academic settings led the U.S. courts to describe cases where developing circumstances made any judgment ineffective as "moot".

The mootness doctrine can be compared to the ripeness doctrine, another court rule (rather than law) that holds that judges should not rule on cases based entirely on anticipated disputes or hypothetical facts. These rules and similar doctrines, taken together, prevent the federal courts of the United States from issuing advisory opinions, as required by the Case or Controversy Clause of the United States Constitution.

The usage in the British legal system, on the other hand, is that the term "moot" has the meaning of "remains open to debate" or "remains unresolved". The divergence in usage was first observed in the United States, and the extent to which the U.S. definition is used in U.S. jurisprudence and public discourse has ensured it is rarely used in a British courtroom. This is partially to avoid ambiguity, but also because the British definition is rarely relevant in practical cases.

== U.S. federal courts ==
In the U.S. federal judicial system, a moot case must be dismissed, there being a constitutional limitation on the jurisdiction of the federal courts. The reason for this is that Article Three of the United States Constitution limits the jurisdiction of all federal courts to "cases and controversies". Thus, a civil action or appeal in which the court's decision will not affect the rights of the parties is ordinarily beyond the power of the court to decide, provided it does not fall within one of the recognized exceptions.

A textbook example of such a case is the United States Supreme Court case DeFunis v. Odegaard, 416 U.S. 312 (1974). The plaintiff was a student who had been denied admission to law school, and had then been provisionally admitted during the pendency of the case. Because the student was slated to graduate within a few months at the time the decision was rendered, and there was no action the law school could take to prevent that, the Court determined that a decision on its part would have no effect on the student's rights. Therefore, the case was dismissed as moot.

However, there is disagreement as to both the source of the standards, and their application in the courts. Some courts and observers opine that cases must be dismissed because this is a constitutional bar, and there is no "case or controversy"; others have rejected the pure constitutional approach and adopted a so-called "prudential" view, where dismissal may depend upon a host of factors, whether the particular person has lost a viable interest in the case, or whether the issue itself survives outside the interests of the particular person, whether the circumstance are likely to recur, etc. In actual practice, the U.S. federal courts have been uneven in their decisions, which has led to the accusation that determinations are ad hoc and 'result-oriented.'

There are four major exceptions to this mootness rule. These are cases of "voluntary cessation" on the part of the defendant; questions that involve secondary or collateral legal consequences; questions that are "capable of repetition, yet evading review"; and questions involving class actions where the named party ceases to represent the class.

=== Voluntary cessation ===
Where a defendant is acting wrongfully, but as a tactic to avoid an adverse decision, ceases to engage in such conduct once a litigation has been threatened or commenced, the court will still not deem this correction to moot the case. Obviously, a party could stop acting improperly just long enough for the case to be dismissed and then resume the improper conduct. For example, in Friends of the Earth, Inc. v. Laidlaw Environmental Services, Inc., 528 U.S. 167 (2000), the Supreme Court held that an industrial polluter, against whom various deterrent civil penalties were being pursued, could not claim that the case was moot, even though the polluter had ceased polluting and had closed the factory responsible for the pollution. The court noted that so long as the polluter still retained its license to operate such a factory, it could open similar operations elsewhere if not deterred by the penalties sought.

A separate situation occurs when a court dismisses as "moot" a legal challenge to an existing law, in the case where the law being challenged is either amended or repealed through legislation before the court case could be settled. Since the remedy available for a bad law is simply the removal or changing of the law, the court's decision cannot create an outcome different than that which has already occurred. As such, any decision would merely be advisory, in violation of the Case or Controversy clause. While this sometimes casually referred to as voluntary cessation, the differences in available remedy make it distinct from technical voluntary cessation.

A recent instance of this occurred in Moore v. Madigan, where Illinois Attorney General Lisa Madigan declined to appeal a ruling from the Seventh Circuit striking down Illinois' handgun carry ban to the United States Supreme Court. As Illinois subsequently passed a law legalizing concealed carry with a state-issued license, the appeal would have been moot since the original case or controversy was no longer relevant.

=== Secondary or collateral legal consequences ===
"The obvious fact of life is that most criminal convictions do in fact entail adverse collateral legal consequences. The mere possibility that this will be the case is enough to preserve a criminal case from ending ignominiously in the limbo of mootness." Sibron v. New York.

=== Capable of repetition, yet evading review ===
A court will allow a case to go forward if it is the type for which persons will frequently be faced with a particular situation, but will likely cease to be in a position where the court can provide a remedy for them in the time that it takes for the justice system to address their situation. The most frequently cited example is the 1973 United States Supreme Court case of Roe v. Wade, 410 U.S. 113 (1973), which challenged a Texas law forbidding abortion in most circumstances. The state argued that the case was moot because plaintiff Roe was no longer pregnant by the time the case was heard. As Justice Blackmun wrote in the majority opinion:

The normal 266-day human gestation period is so short that the pregnancy will come to term before the usual appellate process is complete. If that termination makes a case moot, pregnancy litigation seldom will survive much beyond the trial stage, and appellate review will be effectively denied. Our law should not be that rigid.

By contrast, in McCorvey v. Hill, 2004, the case failed to proceed based on being moot, without standing and out of time.

The Court cited Southern Pacific Terminal Co. v. ICC, 219 U.S. 498 (1911), which had held that a case was not moot when it presented an issue that was "capable of repetition, yet evading review". Perhaps in response to increasing workloads at all levels of the judiciary, the recent trend in the Supreme Court and other U.S. courts has been to construe this exception rather narrowly.

Many cases fall under the "capable of repetition" doctrine; however, because there is a review process available under most circumstances, the exception to declaring mootness did not apply to such cases. In Memphis Light, Gas & Water Div. v. Craft, 436 U. S. 1, 8–9 (1978), the court noted that claims for damages save cases from mootness.

=== Class action representatives ===
Where a class action lawsuit is brought, with one named plaintiff actually representing the interests of many others, the case will not become moot even if the named plaintiff ceases to belong to the class that is seeking a remedy. In Sosna v. Iowa, 419 U.S. 393 (1975), the plaintiff represented a class that was challenging an Iowa law that required persons to reside there for a year before seeking a divorce in Iowa's courts. The Supreme Court held that, although the plaintiff successfully divorced in another state, her attorneys could continue to competently advance the interests of other members of the class.

=== Abuse of mootness doctrine not acceptable ===
Construction of a project without regulatory compliance cannot be used to moot a court case challenge simply because construction has been completed. Since remedies remain available even long after the project has been completed, the case remains non-moot.

For example, where an Environmental Impact Statement (EIS) was challenged, completion of the project construction could not be used to evade regulatory compliance with the National Environmental Policy Act (NEPA), as the 9th Circuit Court explained:

”In the case at hand, were this Court to find the EIS inadequate, or the decision to build along Route D-1 arbitrary and capricious, the agency would have to correct the decision-making process, and ultimately could be required to remove the line from this route. Clearly, therefore, this case presents a live controversy with concrete facts, and parties with adverse interests. The building of the towers has not made the case hypothetical or abstract — the towers still cross the fields of the Landowners, continually obstructing their irrigation systems — and this Court has the power to decide if they may stay or if they may have to be removed. * * * If the fact that the towers are built and operating were enough to make the case nonjusticiable, as the dissent states, then the BPA (and all similar entities) could merely ignore the requirements of NEPA, build its structures before a case gets to court, and then hide behind the mootness doctrine. Such a result is not acceptable."

== U.S. state courts ==
The U.S. state courts are not subject to the Article III limitations on their jurisdiction, and some state courts are permitted by their local constitutions and laws to render opinions in moot cases where the establishment of a legal precedent is desirable. They may also establish exceptions to the doctrine. For instance, in some state courts the prosecution can lodge an appeal after a defendant is acquitted: although the appellate court cannot set aside a not-guilty verdict due to double jeopardy, it can issue a ruling as to whether a trial court's ruling on a particular issue during the trial was erroneous. This opinion will then be binding on future cases heard by the courts of that state.

Some U.S. states also accept certified questions from the federal courts or the courts of other states. Under these procedures, state courts can issue opinions, usually for the purpose of clarifying or updating state law, in cases not actually pending in those courts.

== Outside the U.S. ==
Although free from the U.S. Constitutional limitation, Canada has recognized that considerations of judicial economy and comity with the legislative and executive branch may justify a decision to dismiss an allegedly moot case, as deciding hypothetical controversies is tantamount to legislating. Considerations of the effectiveness of advocacy involved in the adversarial system and the possibility of recurrence of an alleged constitutional violation may sway the court. Additionally, the federal and provincial governments can ask for advisory opinions in hypothetical scenarios, termed reference questions, from their respective highest courts.

== Moot point ==
The phrase 'moot point' refers (in American English) to an issue that is irrelevant to a subject being discussed or (in British English) to one that is debatable. Due to the relatively uncommon usage of the word moot, and because "moot" and "mute" are homophones in some pronunciations, this is sometimes erroneously rendered as "mute point".

== See also ==
- De minimis non curat lex. (The law is not interested in trivia)
- Mock trial, a simulated trial, typically of fact
