= The Harvard Review of Philosophy =

- Discipline: Philosophy
- Language: English
- Edited by: Elisa Diop-Weyer, Matt Kromm

Publication details
- History: 1991–present
- Publisher: Philosophy Documentation Center (United States)
- Frequency: Annual

Standard abbreviations
- ISO 4: Harv. Rev. Philos.

Indexing
- ISSN: 1062-6239 (print); 2153-9154 (web)
- LCCN: sn92025082
- OCLC no.: 25557273

Links
- Journal homepage; Online archive

The Harvard Review of Philosophy is an annual peer-reviewed academic journal of philosophy edited by a student collective at Harvard University. Established in 1991, it publishes articles, reviews, and interviews with living philosophers. The journal is published annually by the Philosophy Documentation Center.

Notable authors include Roderick Chisholm, Jaakko Hintikka, Martha C. Nussbaum, Derek Parfit, and Judith Jarvis Thomson. The journal has published interviews with notable scholars such as Cornel West, Bernard Williams, Umberto Eco, Stanley Cavell, Hilary Putnam, Richard Rorty, and Willard Van Orman Quine. The first issue included an interview with John Rawls, one of the few he ever gave.

The Review's current comp directors are Steaven Ramírez Serrano and Yuanyi Ma.

Three books of collected articles from the journal have been published, one containing a selection of interviews and the others containing philosophical essays:

- Philosophers in Conversation: Interviews from The Harvard Review of Philosophy (2002)
- The Space of Love and Garbage: And Other Essays from The Harvard Review of Philosophy (2008)
- All We Need Is a Paradigm: Essays on Science, Economics, and Logic from The Harvard Review of Philosophy (2009)

The Hardest Logic Puzzle Ever was published in the 1996 issue.

== See also ==
- List of philosophy journals
