= Florence Parr Gere =

Canadian-born American pianist and composer (1875–1964)

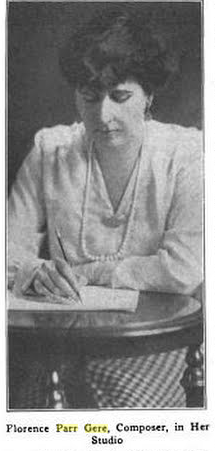
Florence Parr Gere, from a 1918 publication.

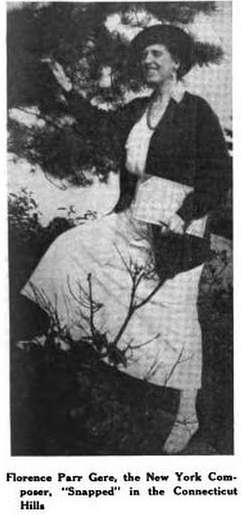
Florence Parr Gere, from a 1918 publication.

Florence Beatrice Parr Gere (April 25, 1875 – September 4, 1964) was a Canadian-born American pianist and composer.

== Early life ==
Florence Beatrice Parr was born in Yarmouth, Nova Scotia, the eldest child of Florence Robbins Parr and Henry Albert Parr. Her father was a dentist associated with the University of Pennsylvania Dental School; Dr. Parr's varied career included espionage for the Confederacy during the American Civil War, and treating presidents Ulysses S. Grant and Chester A. Arthur. Florence Parr trained as a musician under Theodor Leschetizky and Isidor Philipp, and studied composition in Paris and Vienna, and in New York with Max Spicker.

== Career ==
Gere wrote both music and lyrics for songs, with titles such as "A New World is Born" and "I Walked with Anguish in my Heart". Gere's songs were popular with concert singers in New York, including Johanna Gadski, Maggie Teyte, and Marguerite Namara. She also composed music for settings of poems by others, including a setting of John Keats' "The Devon Maid". Composer Meta Schumann used Gere's lyrics for her song "Thee." She hosted gatherings of musicians at her New York home. In 1922 she spent six months in France and Switzerland, studying at the American Conservatory at Fontainebleau with fellow student Aaron Copland, writing "Fontainebleau Sketches" and other compositions that she sold to Hamelle, a French publisher. She supported the work of women composers and musicians, and admired fellow composers Amy Beach and Carrie Jacobs Bond.

Florence Parr Gere funded a contest, the Parr-Gere Music Poem Contest, with the Poetry Society of London. The annual prize was given to the best poem on the topic of music. She was also active in the National Association for American Composers and Conductors (NAACC), in New York and later in Philadelphia.

She was still composing into her eighties, she told an interviewer in 1964, noting, "I don't write 'modern music'. Why disturb beautiful sounds?"

== Personal life ==
Florence Parr married James Belden Gere, a neurologist who was the nephew and namesake of congressman James J. Belden. Florence Parr Gere was widowed in 1920. About 1960, she moved to Philadelphia to help her ailing younger sister, Marion Parr Johnson. She died of heart disease at her home on Pine Street in 1964.

There is a collection of her papers, including music and photographs, in the Library of Congress.
