= White, Smith & Company =

Defunct American music publisher

- Status: Defunct
- Founded: 1867
- Founder: Charles A. White; William F. Smith; J. Frank Perry
- Successor: Edwin H Morris and Co.
- Country of origin: United States
- Headquarters location: Boston, Massachusetts
- Publication types: Sheet music, trade journals

White, Smith & Company was a music publishing firm in Boston, Massachusetts. It issued sheet music and published industry journals, notably the monthly Folio.

== History ==
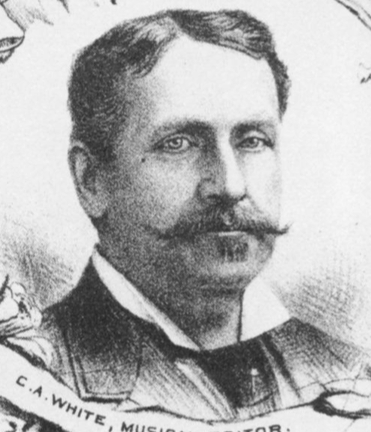
Charles A. White depicted in 1881 in Folio.

The business began in 1867 as a partnership between Charles A. White, William F. Smith, and J. Frank Perry when it was known as White, Smith, & Perry. White was a composer, the author of over a thousand songs. (Note: Ayars notes he wrote over 1,000 songs; Sanjek puts the number of his copyrighted works at over 1,500.) He was among the earliest songwriters to establish a successful music publishing company. Many of his songs became popular; his first hit was "Put Me in My Little Bed" (1870). The firm owed a portion of its success to sales of White's compositions, but other sheet music published by them was also successful: "Shoo Fly, Don't Bother Me", published in 1869, sold nearly 200,000 copies. In the early 1870s, the firm also published the earliest works of James A. Bland, who would become one of the most popular songwriters of the late 19th century.

Perry left in 1874 to establish his own publishing company, (Note: Bland followed Perry who would publish his most popular songs including, "Carry Me Back to Old Virginny".) after which White and Smith's firm became known as White, Smith, & Co. The company continued to prosper, in 1882 publishing White's most successful composition, "Marguerite", which would sell over a million copies through the following two decades. (Note: "Marguerite" was interpolated into Denman Thompson's 1885 play The Old Homstead which toured for 20 years.) By 1890, White, Smith had expanded to nine branch offices and become one of the largest music publishing firms in the country.

When Smith died in June 1891, White bought his interest in the company and made his son, Daniel L. White, his partner. Charles White died in 1897 at which time the company was incorporated under the name of White-Smith Music Publishing Company with Daniel White as president. The founder's grandson, also named Charles A. White, became the company president in August 1919 on the death of Daniel White, his father. According to historian H. E. Johnson, in 1944 the firm "sold its catalogue to Edwin H. Morris & Co. of New York ... but continued in the business of music printing as White, Smith Printing Co. at 40 Winchester Street until 1973."

== Journals ==
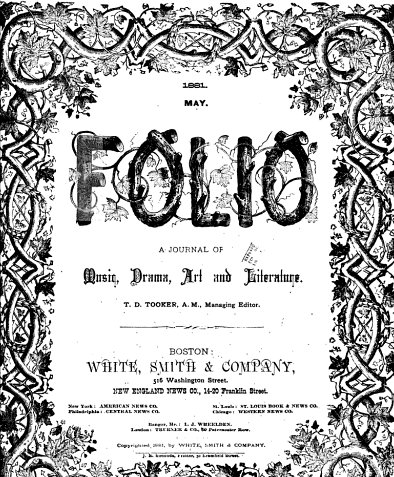
Cover of The Folio in 1881.

The company's journal, The Folio, was first published in September 1869 at an annual subscription price of $1. Dexter Smith was hired to be the first editor; Smith was a Boston poet, lyricist, and critic who also published his own magazine from 1872 to 1877. In addition to poetry, fiction, and news items related to the music industry, each issue of Folio included 16 pages of sheet music. Its chief objective was the promotion of its publisher, and its last issue was printed in October 1895.

White, Smith also published a journal devoted entirely to organ music, The Organist's Quarterly Journal and Review.

== See also ==
- White-Smith Music Publishing Company v. Apollo Company, 1908
