= Grace Hofheimer =

American pianist

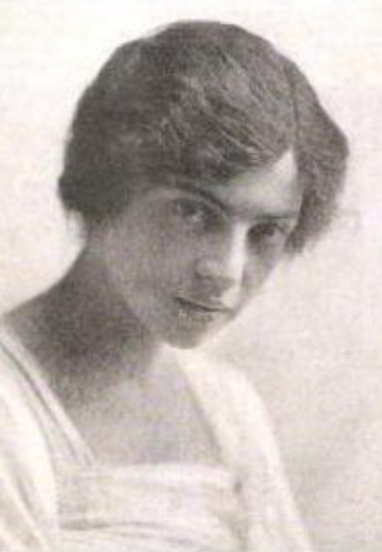
- Grace Hofheimer, from a 1920 publication
- Born: August 27, 1891; New York City
- Died: September 1965 (aged 74)
- Occupations: Pianist, educator

Grace M. Hofheimer (August 27, 1891 – September 1965) was an American pianist, composer, and educator, author of Teaching Techniques For The Piano (1954).

== Early life and education ==
Hofheimer was born in New York City, the daughter of Justinian Alman Hofheimer and Rose Clare Leonard Hofheimer. Her father was a physician. She studied piano with Andre Benoist, and Isidor Philipp. At Columbia University she studied music theory under Daniel Gregory Mason.

== Career ==
Hofheimer was a concert pianist, based in New York City. In 1918, the Brooklyn Daily Eagle reported that "Miss Hofheimer, who has devoted her time to teaching, possesses an abundant technique and a straightforwardness of interpretation," while noting "a mechanical lack of variety of tone and color, that precluded the expression of the inner essesnce of the compositions."

Hofheimer toured for the Edison Company during the 1920-1921 season. She was head of the piano department at the Chase School in Brooklyn, and gave private lessons from a studio at Steinway Hall. In 1923, she played on a radio broadcast, and taught a summer course in New Jersey, Among her students were mathematician Raymond Smullyan and music professor Morton Schoenfeld.

Later in life, Hofheimer was chair of the Greater New York Guild of Piano Teachers. She adjudicated auditions for the National Guild of Piano Teachers and the Mid-South Piano Scholarship Association, and spoke to music teachers' organizations. Hofheimer wrote Teaching Techniques for the Piano (1954). She also composed piano pieces suited for teaching.

== Publications ==
- "Reasons for Counting Aloud" (1926, article)
- Birthday Greetings (1926, compositions)
- Teaching Techniques for the Piano (1954)

== Personal life ==
Hofheimer died in 1965, at the age of 74.
