= James Wilson (Founding Father) =

Founding Father of the United States (1742–1798)

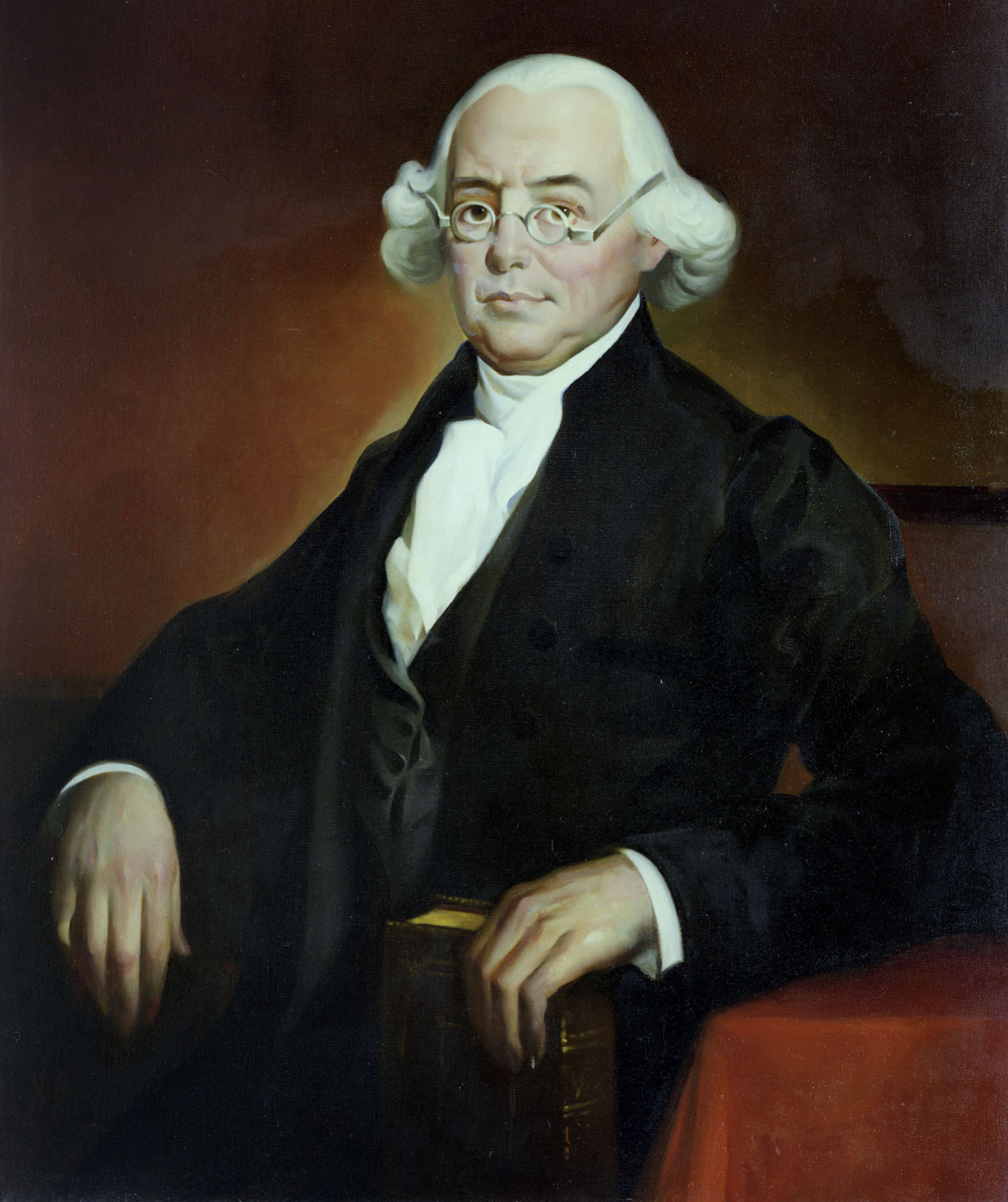

Associate Justice of the Supreme Court of the United States
- In office October 5, 1789 – August 21, 1798
- Nominated by: George Washington
- Preceded by: Seat established
- Succeeded by: Bushrod Washington

Personal details
- Born: September 14, 1742 Carskerdo Farm, Fife, Scotland
- Died: August 21, 1798 (aged 55) Edenton, North Carolina, U.S.
- Party: Federalist
- Spouse(s): Rachel Bird (m. 1771; died 1786) Hannah Gray (m. 1793)
- Education: University of St Andrews; University of Glasgow; University of Edinburgh

Military service
- Allegiance: United Colonies of North America
- Branch/service: Continental Army
- Years of service: 1775–1783
- Rank: Brigadier General
- Unit: 4th Pennsylvania Regiment
- Battles/wars: American Revolutionary War

James Wilson (September 14, 1742 – August 21, 1798) was a Scottish American Founding Father, legal scholar, jurist, and statesman who served as an associate justice of the United States Supreme Court from 1789 to 1798. Wilson was elected twice to the Continental Congress, and was a signatory of the Declaration of Independence. In 1787 he was a major participant in drafting the U.S. Constitution, and became one of only six people to sign both documents. A leading legal theorist, he was one of the first four Associate Justices appointed to the Supreme Court by George Washington.

In his capacity as the first professor of law at the College of Philadelphia (a year after he was appointed as a professor at the College of Philadelphia, the college merged with University of the State of Pennsylvania to become the University of Pennsylvania), he taught the first course on the new Constitution to President Washington and his Cabinet in 1789 and 1790 and continued as a professor of law at Penn until his death in 1798.

Born near Leven, Fife, Scotland, Wilson immigrated to Philadelphia in 1766 and became a teacher at the College of Philadelphia. After studying law under John Dickinson, he was admitted to the bar and set up legal practice in Reading, Pennsylvania. He wrote a well-received pamphlet arguing that the British Parliament's taxation of the Thirteen Colonies was illegitimate because the colonies lacked representation in Parliament. In 1775, he was elected to the Continental Congress, where he signed the Declaration of Independence the next year. In addition to his roles in public service, Wilson served as president of the Illinois-Wabash Company, a land speculation venture.

Wilson was a delegate to the 1787 Constitutional Convention in Philadelphia, where he was a member of the Committee of Detail which produced the first draft of the Constitution. He was the principal architect of the executive branch of the federal government and was an outspoken supporter of greater participatory democracy, a strong national government, and proportional legislative representation based on population. Along with Roger Sherman and Charles Pinckney, he proposed the Three-fifths Compromise, which counted three-fifths of each state's slave population toward that state's total population for the purposes of representation in the United States House of Representatives. While preferring the direct election of the president through a national popular vote, he proposed the use of an electoral college, which provided the basis of the Electoral College system ultimately adopted by the convention. Following the convention, Wilson campaigned for the Constitution's ratification, and his "speech in the statehouse yard" was reprinted in newspapers throughout the country. However, he opposed the Bill of Rights. Wilson also played a major role in drafting the 1790 Pennsylvania Constitution.

In 1789, Wilson joined the Supreme Court and also was named a professor of law on the faculty at the College of Philadelphia. Wilson experienced financial ruin in the Panic of 1796–1797 and was sent to debtors' prison on two occasions. In August 1798, he suffered a stroke, becoming the first U.S. Supreme Court justice to die.

== Early life and education ==
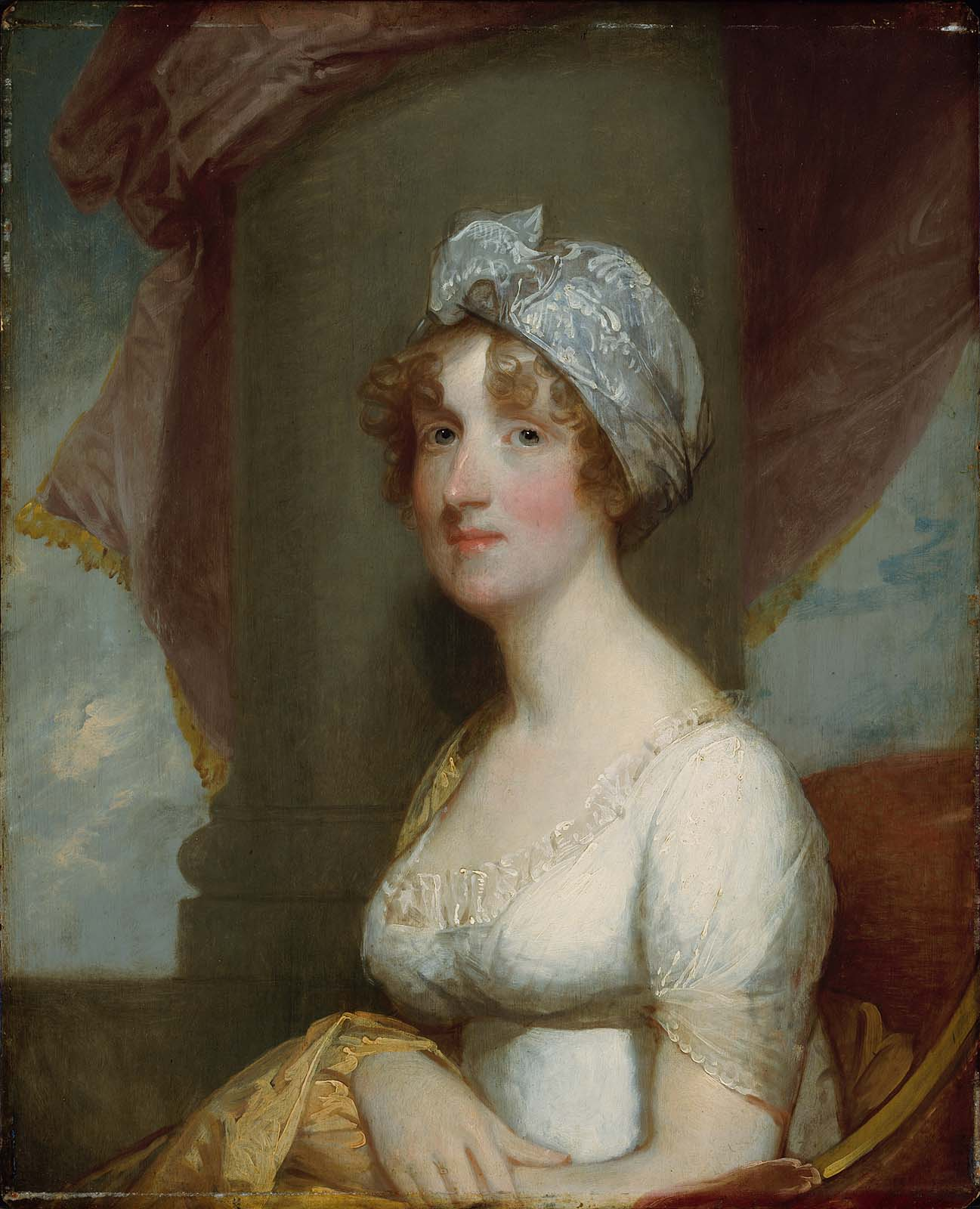
Hannah Gray

Wilson was born at Carskerdo, near Ceres, Fife, Scotland, on September 14, 1742. He was the fourth of the seven children of Alison Landall and William Wilson, a Presbyterian farming family. He studied at the universities of St Andrews, Glasgow and Edinburgh, but never obtained a degree. While he was a student, he studied Scottish Enlightenment thinkers, including Francis Hutcheson, David Hume and Adam Smith. He also played golf. Imbued with the ideas of the Scottish Enlightenment, he moved to Philadelphia, Pennsylvania, in British America in 1765, carrying letters of introduction that enabled him to begin tutoring and then teaching at The academy and College of Philadelphia (now the University of Pennsylvania). He petitioned there for a degree and was awarded an honorary Master of Arts several months later. In 1790, the university awarded him the honorary degree of LL.D.

While tutoring and teaching, Wilson began to study law in the office of John Dickinson. He attained admission to the bar in Philadelphia in 1767 and established a practice in Reading, Pennsylvania. His office was very successful, and he earned a small fortune in a few years. By then he had a small farm near Carlisle, Pennsylvania, was handling cases in eight local counties, became a founding trustee of Dickinson College, and was lecturing at The academy and College of Philadelphia. In 1768 he was elected to membership of the American Philosophical Society, and from 1781 to 1783 he was the vice president of the society. Wilson's religious beliefs evolved throughout his life and have been the subject of some dispute, as there are writings from various points of his life from which it can be argued that he leaned towards Presbyterianism, Anglicanism, Thomism, or Deism, although it has been deemed likely that he eventually favored some form of Christianity.

On November 5, 1771, he married Rachel Bird, daughter of William Bird and Bridget Hulings; they had six children together: Mary, William, Bird, James, Emily, and Charles. Rachel died in 1786, and in 1793 he married Hannah Gray, daughter of Ellis Gray and Sarah D'Olbear; the marriage produced a son named Henry, who died at age three. Hannah had previously been the widow of Thomas Bartlett, M.D.

== American Revolution ==
In 1774, Wilson published "Considerations on the Nature and Extent of the Legislative Authority of the British Parliament." In this pamphlet, Wilson argued that the Parliament had no authority to pass laws for the American colonies because the colonies had no representation in Parliament. It presented his views that all power derived from the people. Yet, he wrote that the people owed their allegiance to the British king: "A denial of the legislative authority of the British parliament over America is by no means inconsistent with that connexion, which ought to subsist between the mother country and her colonies." Scholars considered his work on par with the seminal works of Thomas Jefferson and John Adams of the same year. However, it was actually penned in 1768, perhaps the first cogent argument to be formulated against the authority of the Crown. Some scholars see Wilson as a leading revolutionary while others see him as a reluctant, elite revolutionary reacting to the stream of events determined by the radicals on the ground.

In 1775, he was commissioned colonel of the 4th Cumberland County Battalion and rose to the rank of brigadier general of the Pennsylvania State Militia. He served until the war ended in 1783.

As a member of the Continental Congress in 1776, Wilson was a firm advocate for independence. Believing it was his duty to follow the wishes of his constituents, Wilson refused to vote until he had caucused his district. Only after he received more feedback did he vote for independence. While serving in the Congress, Wilson was clearly among the leaders in the formation of French policy. "If the positions he held and the frequency with which he appeared on committees concerned with Indian affairs are an index, he was until his departure from Congress in 1777 the most active and influential single delegate in laying down the general outline that governed the relations of Congress with the border tribes."

Wilson also served from June 1776 on the Committee on Spies, along with Adams, Jefferson, John Rutledge, and Robert R. Livingston.

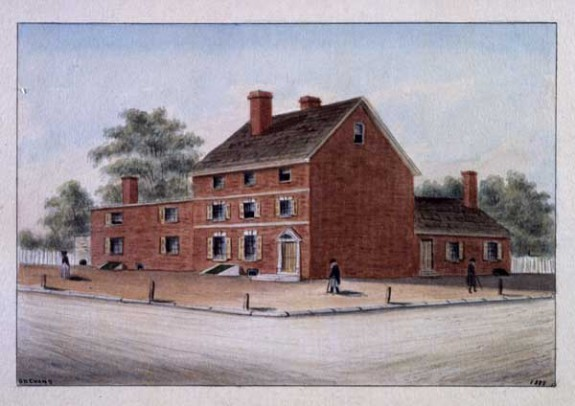
"Fort Wilson", the house of James Wilson on the southwest corner of Third and Walnut Streets in Philadelphia

On October 4, 1779, the Fort Wilson riot began. After the British had abandoned Philadelphia, Wilson successfully defended at trial 23 people from property seizure and exile by the radical government of Pennsylvania. A mob whipped up by liquor and the writings and speeches of Joseph Reed, president of Pennsylvania's Supreme Executive Council, marched on Congressman Wilson's home at Third and Walnut Streets. Wilson and 35 of his colleagues barricaded themselves in his home, later nicknamed Fort Wilson. In the fighting that ensued, six died, and 17 to 19 were wounded. The city's soldiers, the First Troop Philadelphia City Cavalry and Baylor's 3rd Continental Light Dragoons, eventually intervened and rescued Wilson and his colleagues. The rioters were pardoned and released by Reed.

Wilson closely identified with the aristocratic and conservative republican groups, multiplied his business interests, and accelerated his land speculation. He became involved with the Illinois-Wabash Company during the War for Independence and was made its president in 1780. He became the company's largest single investor, owning one and a half shares outright and two shares by proxy, totaling over 1,000,000 acres (400,000 ha) of land. Wilson further expanded his land holdings by cofounding the Canna Company with Mark Bird, Robert Lettis Hooper, and William Bingham in order to sell land along the Susquehanna River in New York. Additionally, Wilson individually bought huge quantities of land in Pennsylvania in 1784 and 56,000 acres (23,000 ha) of land in Virginia during the 1780s. To round out his holdings, Wilson, in conjunction with Michael and Bernard Gratz, Levi Hollingsworth, Charles Willing, and Dorsey Pentecost, purchased 321,000 acres (130,000 ha) of land south of the Ohio River.

During the war, Wilson took a position as advocate general for France in America (1779–1783), dealing with commercial and maritime matters, and legally defended Loyalists and their sympathizers. He held this post until his death in 1798.

== Constitutional Convention ==
We now see the circle of government, beautiful and complete. By the people, its springs are put in motion originally: By the people, its administration is consummated: At first; at last; their power is predominant and supreme.

— James Wilson

One of the most prominent lawyers of his time, Wilson was the most learned of the Framers of the Constitution. He was one of the most prolific speakers at the Constitutional Convention, with James Madison's notes indicating that Wilson spoke 168 times, second only in number to Gouverneur Morris. Wilson argued in support of greater popular control of governance, a strong national government, and for legislative representation to be proportional to population. To this end, he championed the popularly elected House of Representatives, opposed the Senate (and, unable to prevent its inclusion, advocated for the direct election of senators), supported a national popular vote for the selection of the president, and argued that the Constitution should be ratified directly by citizens in state conventions rather than by state legislatures. Wilson also advocated for broader suffrage (he was, for instance, one of the few delegates who believed the vote should not be restricted only to property owners) and was one of the few major Founders to articulate a belief in the principle of giving the voters as much discretion and power as possible.

As historian Nicholas Pederson put it:

Wilson, more than any other delegate, consistently advocated placing as much power as was feasible with the people themselves—giving them as direct control as was possible over operation of the federal government's machinery...Wilson alone, who wielded formidable intellect on behalf of democracy throughout the Convention, is a major part of the reason why the Constitution ended up as democratic a document as it did.

He advocated for multi-member districts as a way to make elections more fair. In 1791, in his Lectures on Law, Wilson stated "It may, I believe, be assumed as a general maxim, of no small importance in democratical governments, that the more extensive the district of election is, the choice will be the more wise and enlightened".

Despite owning a household slave himself, in rhetoric he argued against slavery. While he remained relatively quiet on the issue throughout the convention out of fear of alienating the pro-slavery delegates, whose support was needed to ratify the new constitution, he believed that the thrust of the constitution laid the foundation for "banishing slavery out of this country" and made certain technical objections to clauses like the Fugitive Slave Clause. Ultimately, however, his most substantial contribution on this issue was his proposal of the Three-fifths Compromise, which would count three-fifths of each state's slave population toward that state's total population for the purposes of representation in the House of Representatives. As the Convention proceeded, he would come to disavow the compromise; nevertheless, it was accepted into the new constitution, becoming one of its most infamous clauses.

Wilson has been credited with adding the word "We" as first word of the constitution leading to the now famous phrase "We the people...."

On economics, Wilson wished the Constitution to make clear that the federal government (like the state governments) had no power to make anything other than gold or silver a tender in payment of debts, formally forbidding the federal government from issuing paper money.

Mr. Wilson & Mr. Sherman moved to insert after the words "coin money" the words "nor emit bills of credit, nor make any thing but gold & silver coin a tender in payment of debts" making these prohibitions absolute, instead of making the measures allowable (as in the XIII art) with the consent of the Legislature of the U.S. ... Mr. Sherman thought this a favorable crisis for crushing paper money. If the consent of the Legislature could authorize emissions of it, the friends of paper money would make every exertion to get into the Legislature in order to license it."

=== Designing the presidency ===
Wilson has been variously called by scholars the "principal architect of the executive branch", "probably the single most important author of Article II", and the man whose "conception of the presidency...was in the final analysis the presidency we got". Using his understanding of civic virtue as defined by the Scottish Enlightenment, Wilson was active in the construction of the presidency's structure, its power, and its manner of selection. He spoke 56 times, calling for a chief executive who would be energetic, independent, and accountable. He was the first to propose a unitary executive (a proposal which initially provoked concern—having only recently won independence from the British Crown, many delegates were concerned vesting executive power in a single individual would lead to monarchy), and was its strongest proponent. Rival proposals included a triumvirate or leaving the composition of the executive to the legislature. Wilson, however, maintained that a single chief executive would provide for greater public accountability than a group and thereby protect against tyranny by making it plain who was responsible for executive actions. He also submitted that a singular chief executive was necessary to ensure promptness and consistency and guard against deadlock, which could be essential in times of national emergency. Wilson's unitary executive was ultimately adopted by the convention.

The executive as well as the legislative power ought to be restrained. ... The restraints on the legislative authority, must from its nature, be chiefly internal; that is, they must proceed from some part or division of itself. But the restraints on the executive power are external. These restraints are applied with the greatest certainty, and with greatest efficacy, when the object of restraint is clearly ascertained. This is best done, when one object only, distinguished and responsible, is conspicuously held up to the view and examination of the publick [sic]. . . . In planning, forming and arranging laws, deliberation is always becoming, and always useful. But in the active scenes of government, there are emergencies, in which the man, as, in other cases, the women [sic], who deliberates is lost. Secrecy may be equally necessary as dispatch. But, can either secrecy or dispatch be expected, when, to every enterprise, mutual communication, mutual consultation, and mutual agreement among men, perhaps of discordant views, of discordant tempers, and of discordant interests, are indispensably necessary? How much time will be consumed! and when it is consumed, how little business will be done! When the time is elapsed; when the business is finished; when the state is in distress, perhaps on the verge of destruction; on whom shall we fix the blame? Whom shall we select as the object of punishment?

— James Wilson

One of the issues that most divided the convention was the method of selecting the president, with Wilson observing that the issue had "greatly divided" the Convention and was "in truth the most difficult". For his part, Wilson forthrightly supported the direct election of the president through a national popular vote. He believed that a popular election would make the presidency accountable to the people, and he believed more broadly that direct elections would make each branch of government "as independent as possible of each other, as well as of the states". This proposal, however, was received with decidedly mixed opinion, in part because some delegates wanted the selection of the president to be insulated from the popular will and in part because it would not count southern states' slave populations towards their voting power (which had been the major concern leading to the infamous Three-fifths Compromise). In an attempt to accommodate these objections, Wilson proposed selection by an electoral college, which would divide the states into districts in number proportional to their population, from which voters would choose electors who would in turn cast ballots for the president on their behalf. But this too was initially greeted unenthusiastically.

The proposal that at first received the greatest traction was one that Wilson disliked: selection by the legislature (Wilson had tried to accommodate the desires of these "congressionalists" in his electoral college proposal by including a contingent election, which would hand the selection of the president to Congress if no candidate received a majority of electoral votes). Yet further discussion uncovered consequences of legislative selection that many delegates considered objectionable; in particular, they worried that if the president was allowed to seek a second term (a widely supported notion), then legislative selection would make the president dependent on the legislature for re-eligibility, imperiling the principle of separation of powers.

Deadlocked on the method for selecting the president, the issue was ultimately left to the Committee of Unfinished Parts (also referred to as the Committee of Postponed Parts or the Committee of Eleven), which near the end of the months-long Constitutional Convention was tasked with resolving the remaining unfinished portions of the constitution. It was in this committee that an "eleventh-hour compromise", as Supreme Court Justice Elena Kagan has described it, was struck, which settled on the use of an electoral college very similar to the one Wilson had earlier proposed. The committee constructed a complex structure that, with few alterations, would become the Electoral College. In this system, each state would be awarded a number of electors equal to its number of House Representatives and Senators (this encoded within it the Three-fifths Compromise, boosting the slave states' representation in the Electoral College above their voting populations). Each state's legislature would decide upon the manner in which that state's electors would be chosen, and the electors would cast votes for the presidency. In the case that no presidential candidate received a majority of electoral votes, a contingent election would be triggered, handing the selection of the president to the Senate. After the Committee released their proposal, and at Wilson's urging, the contingent election was shifted from the Senate to the House of Representatives. With this alteration, the Electoral College—embodying a "web of compromises" that functioned as a "consensus second choice, made acceptable, in part, by the remarkably complex details of the electoral process"—was accepted by the convention.

Wilson believed that the moderate level of class conflict in American society produced a level of sociability and inter-class friendships that could make the presidency the symbolic leader of the entire American people. Wilson did not consider the possibility of bitterly polarized political parties. He saw popular sovereignty as the cement that held America together linking the interests of the people and of the presidential administration. The president should be a man of the people who embodied the national responsibility for the public good and provided transparency or accountability by being a highly visible national leader, as opposed to numerous largely anonymous congressmen.

=== Committee of Detail ===
Wilson's most lasting impact on the country came as a member of the Committee of Detail, which wrote out the first draft of the United States Constitution. He wanted senators and the president to be popularly elected. Along with Madison, he was perhaps the best versed of the framers in the study of political economy. He understood clearly the central problem of dual sovereignty (nation and state) and held a vision of an almost limitless future for the United States. A witness to Wilson's performance during the convention, Dr. Benjamin Rush, called Wilson's mind "one blaze of light." Madison and Wilson far outdistanced the others at the convention as political theorists, and they were two of the closest allies in both the convention debates and ratification effort afterward.

Though not in agreement with all parts of the final draft, Wilson spoke out in favor of its adoption. He was a delegate to the Pennsylvania ratifying convention. On December 12, 1787, Pennsylvania become the second state (after Delaware) to ratify the document.

=== Statehouse Yard speech ===
His October 6, 1787, "speech in the statehouse yard" (delivered in the courtyard behind Independence Hall) has been seen as particularly important in setting the terms of the ratification debate, both locally and nationally. During the debates, it was more influential than The Federalist Papers. It was printed in newspapers, and copies of the speech were distributed by George Washington to generate support for the ratification of the Constitution.

In particular, it focused on the fact that there would be a popularly elected national government for the first time. He distinguished "three simple species of government": monarchy, aristocracy, and "a republic or democracy, where the people at large retain the supreme power, and act either collectively or by representation." During the speech, Wilson also had harsh criticism for the proposed Bill of Rights. Powers over assembly, the press, search and seizure, and others covered in the Bill of Rights were, according to Wilson, not granted in the Enumerated powers so therefore were unnecessary amendments.

Wilson was later instrumental in the redrafting of the Pennsylvania Constitution of 1776, leading the group in favor of a new constitution, and entering into an agreement with William Findley (leader of the Constitutionalist Party) that limited the partisan feeling that had previously characterized Pennsylvanian politics.

== Supreme Court (1789–1798) ==
After the ratification of the Constitution, Wilson, a learned legal mind, desired to be the first chief justice of the Supreme Court of the United States. President Washington, however, ultimately selected John Jay for that position. Instead, on September 24, 1789, Washington nominated Wilson to be an associate justice of the United States Supreme Court. He was confirmed by the United States Senate on September 26, 1789, and was sworn into office on October 5, 1789.

Wilson and the other early judges spent most of their time circuit riding, overseeing cases on the circuit courts rather than on the Supreme Court bench. Only nine cases were heard by the court from his appointment in 1789 until his death in 1798. Important among these was Chisholm v. Georgia (1793), which granted federal courts the affirmative power to hear disputes between private citizens and states. This ruling was superseded by the Eleventh Amendment, which conflicted with Wilson's view that states did not enjoy sovereign immunity from suits made by citizens of other states in federal court. Two other important cases were Hylton v. United States (1796), which clarified the power of Congress to levy taxes, and Ware v. Hylton (1796), which held that treaties take precedence over state law under the U.S. Constitution. Wilson concurred with the majority on both rulings. During Wilson's last two years on the court, he largely abdicated his role on the Supreme Court bench and rode circuit in the South to avoid creditors. He served on the Supreme Court until his death on August 21, 1798.

== University of Pennsylvania ==
Wilson became the first professor of law at the College of Philadelphia in 1790—only the second at any academic institution in the United States. He mostly ignored the practical matters of legal training; like many of his educated contemporaries, he viewed the academic study of law as a branch of a general cultured education, rather than solely as a prelude to a profession.

Wilson broke off his first course of law lectures in April 1791 to attend to his duties as Supreme Court justice on circuit. He appears to have begun a second-year course in late 1791 or in early 1792 (by which time the College of Philadelphia merged with University of the State of Pennsylvania to become the University of Pennsylvania), but at some unrecorded point the lectures to Congress stopped again and were never resumed. They were not published (except for the first) until after his death, in an edition produced by his son Bird Wilson in 1804. The University of Pennsylvania Law School in Philadelphia officially traces its foundation to Wilson's lectures to Congress and Wilson also continued to teach law to Penn students until his death in 1798.

== Final days ==
Wilson's final years were marked by financial failures. He assumed heavy debts investing in land that became liabilities with the onset of the Panic of 1796–1797. Of note was the failure in Pennsylvania with Theophilus Cazenove. In debt, Wilson was briefly imprisoned in a debtors' prison in Burlington, New Jersey. His son paid the debt, but Wilson went to North Carolina to escape other creditors. He was again briefly imprisoned but continued his duties on the Federal judicial circuit. In 1798, he suffered a bout of malaria and then died of a stroke at age 55, while visiting a friend in Edenton, North Carolina. He was buried in the Johnston cemetery on Hayes Plantation near Edenton but was reinterred in 1906 at Christ Churchyard, Philadelphia.

His papers, which contained early draft versions of the U.S. Constitution, were donated by an heir to the Historical Society of Pennsylvania in 1877.

== See also ==
- Memorial to the 56 Signers of the Declaration of Independence
- List of justices of the Supreme Court of the United States
- List of United States Supreme Court justices by time in office
- United States Supreme Court cases during the Ellsworth Court
- United States Supreme Court cases during the Marshall Court
- United States Supreme Court cases during the Rutledge Court

== Notes ==
Legal offices
| New seat | Associate Justice of the Supreme Court of the United States; 1789–1798 | Succeeded by Bushrod Washington |
