= 1777 Maryland gubernatorial election =

- February 13, 1777
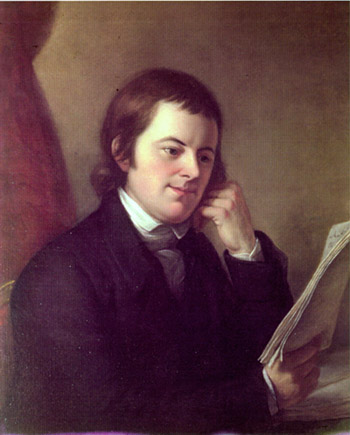

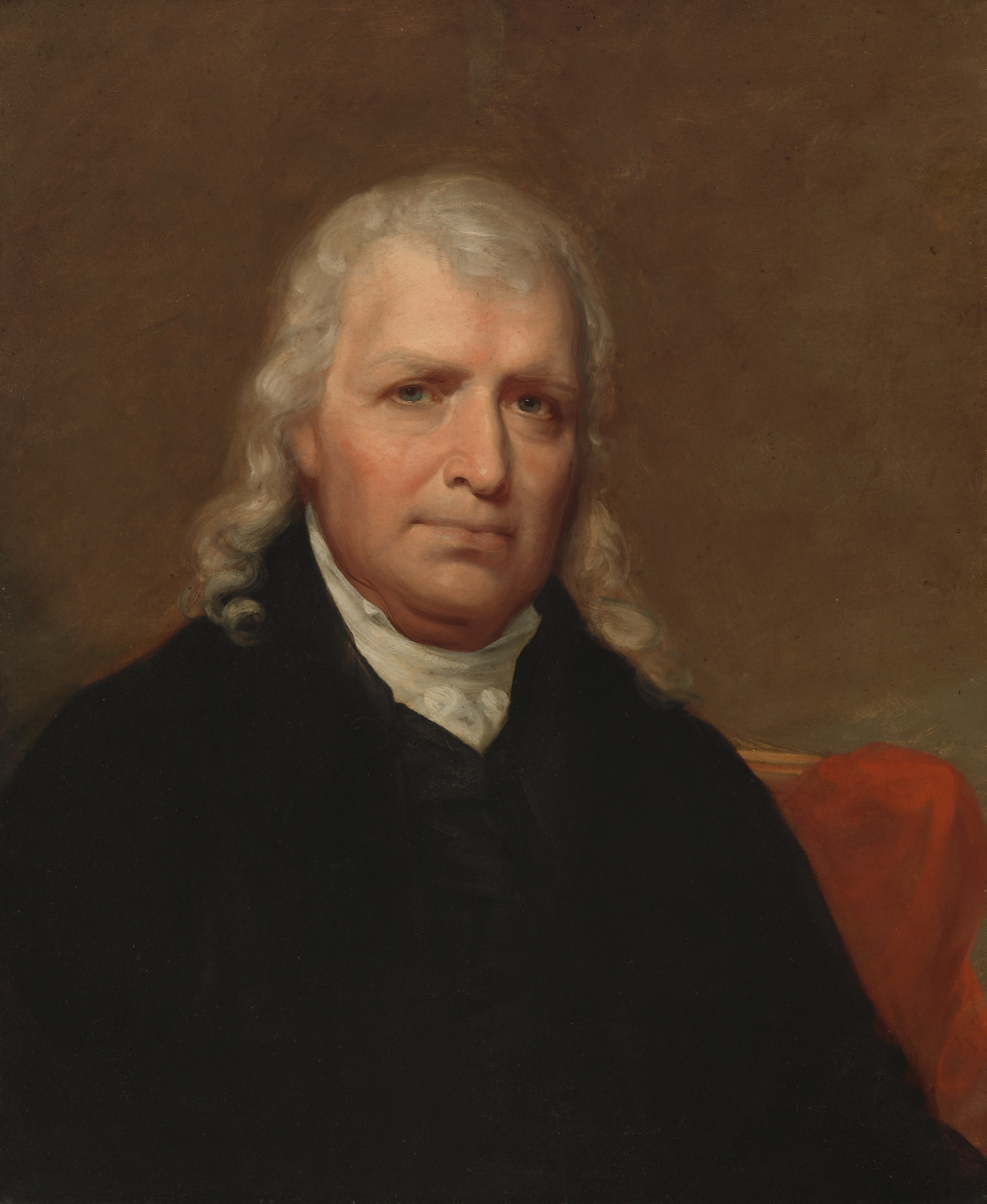
| Nominee | Thomas Johnson | Samuel Chase |
| Party | Nonpartisan | Nonpartisan |
| Popular vote | 40 | 9 |
| Percentage | 76.92% | 17.32% |
Governor before election
Sir Robert Eden
(As Colonial Governor of Maryland)
Elected Governor
Thomas Johnson
Nonpartisan

The 1777 Maryland gubernatorial election was held on February 13, 1777, in order to elect the First Governor of Maryland. Candidate Thomas Johnson was elected by the Maryland General Assembly against Samuel Chase and other candidates.

== General election ==
On election day, February 13, 1777, Thomas Johnson was elected by the Maryland General Assembly. Johnson was sworn in as the 1st Governor of Maryland on March 21, 1777.

=== Results ===
Maryland gubernatorial election, 1777
| Party | Candidate | Votes | % |
|---|---|---|---|
| Nonpartisan | Thomas Johnson | 40 | 76.92 |
| Nonpartisan | Samuel Chase | 9 | 17.32 |
| | Scattering | 3 | 5.76 |
| Total votes | | 52 | 100.00 |
| Nonpartisan hold | | | |
