= Catoctin Furnace =

Historic district in Maryland, United States

- Catoctin Furnace Historic District
- U.S. National Register of Historic Places
- U.S. Historic district
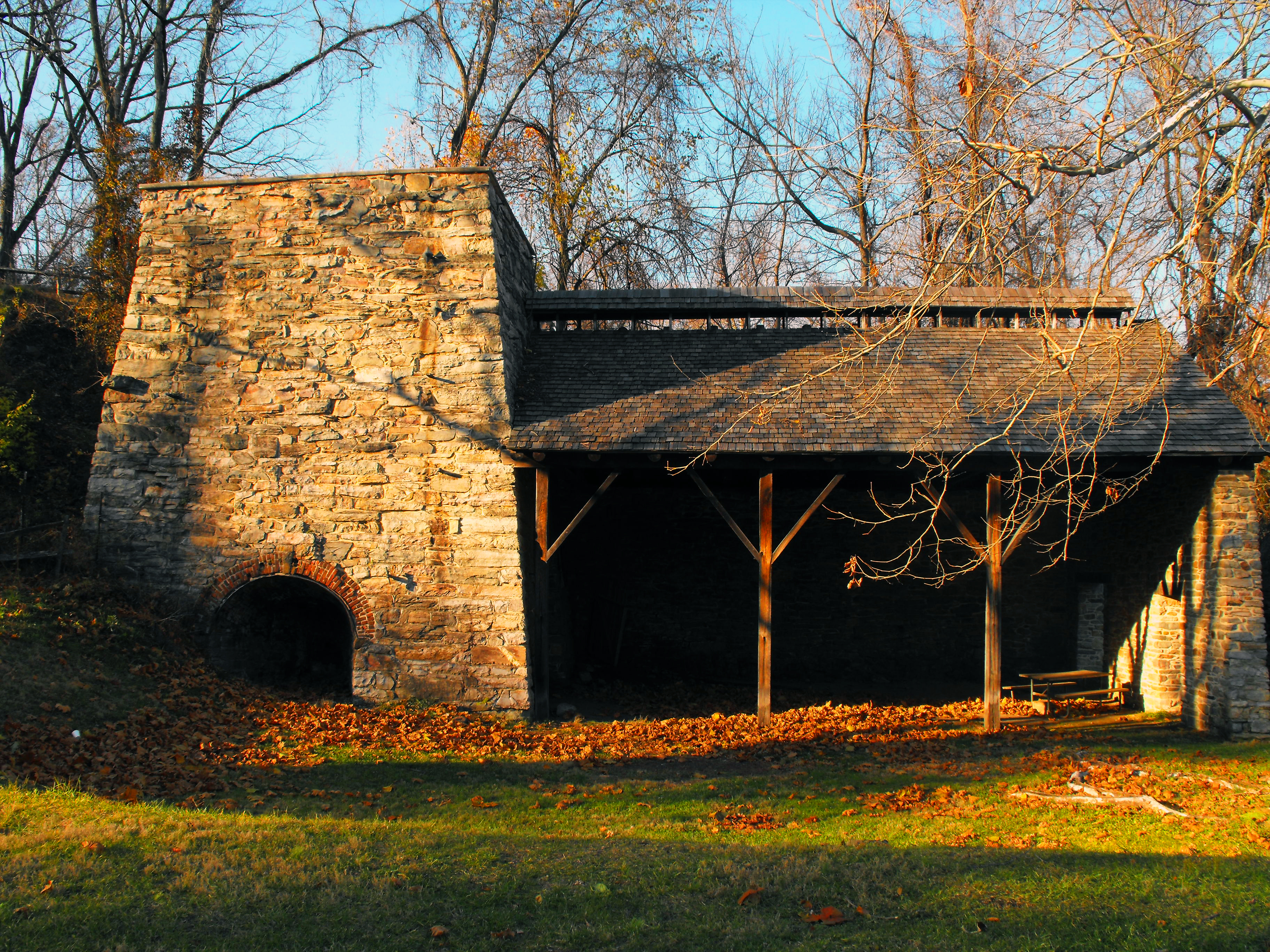

- Location within Maryland Location within the United States
- Location: Catoctin Furnace, Maryland
- Coordinates: 39°34′35″N 77°26′2″W
- Built: 1774
- NRHP reference No.: 72000578
- Added to NRHP: February 11, 1972

Catoctin Furnace (also known as Catoctin Iron Furnace) is a historic iron forge located on Route 15, between Frederick and Thurmont, in Catoctin Furnace, Maryland. Since its closure in 1903, no forge has operated at the site.

== History ==
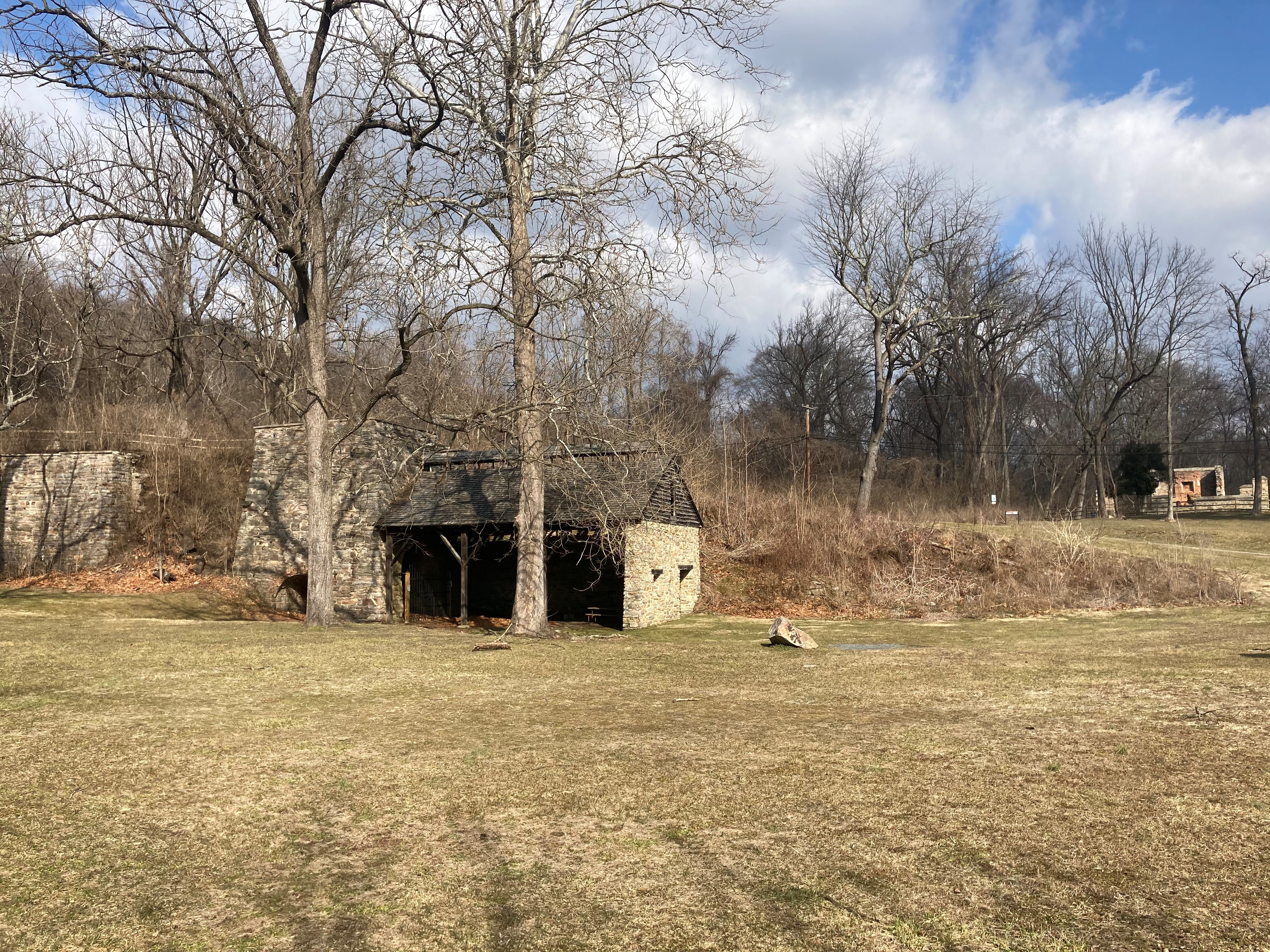
Catoctin Furnace in March 2021

Catoctin Furnace was constructed in 1774 by four brothers Thomas, Baker, Roger and James Johnson to produce pig iron from locally mined hematite. Operated as a blast furnace by 1776, this foundry provided ammunition (cannonballs) for the American Revolutionary War. Some sources state that it also provided cannons. They also state that iron from this furnace was (much later) used to make plates for the USS Monitor; however that is considered unlikely by researchers. Slaves operated the furnace during this time. In 2023 a research project identified 41799 descendants of these slaves and is considering to notify them. The Johnson brothers owned the furnaces at the site at first collectively, and after 1793 singly, until 1811.

Ultimately, three furnaces were built at the site, each named for the site. The first Catoctin Furnace was rebuilt a short distance away in 1787. The second, named Isabella was built in the 1850s by Jacob Kunkel (references give dates from 1853 to 1867). It still stands, within Cunningham Falls State Park.

The first two furnaces burned charcoal. The third, which opened in 1873, burned coke (some sources say anthracite coal, though this would be more costly). The entire complex closed in 1903 (attributed to rising costs and the too-late introduction of a rail link).

== Present day ==
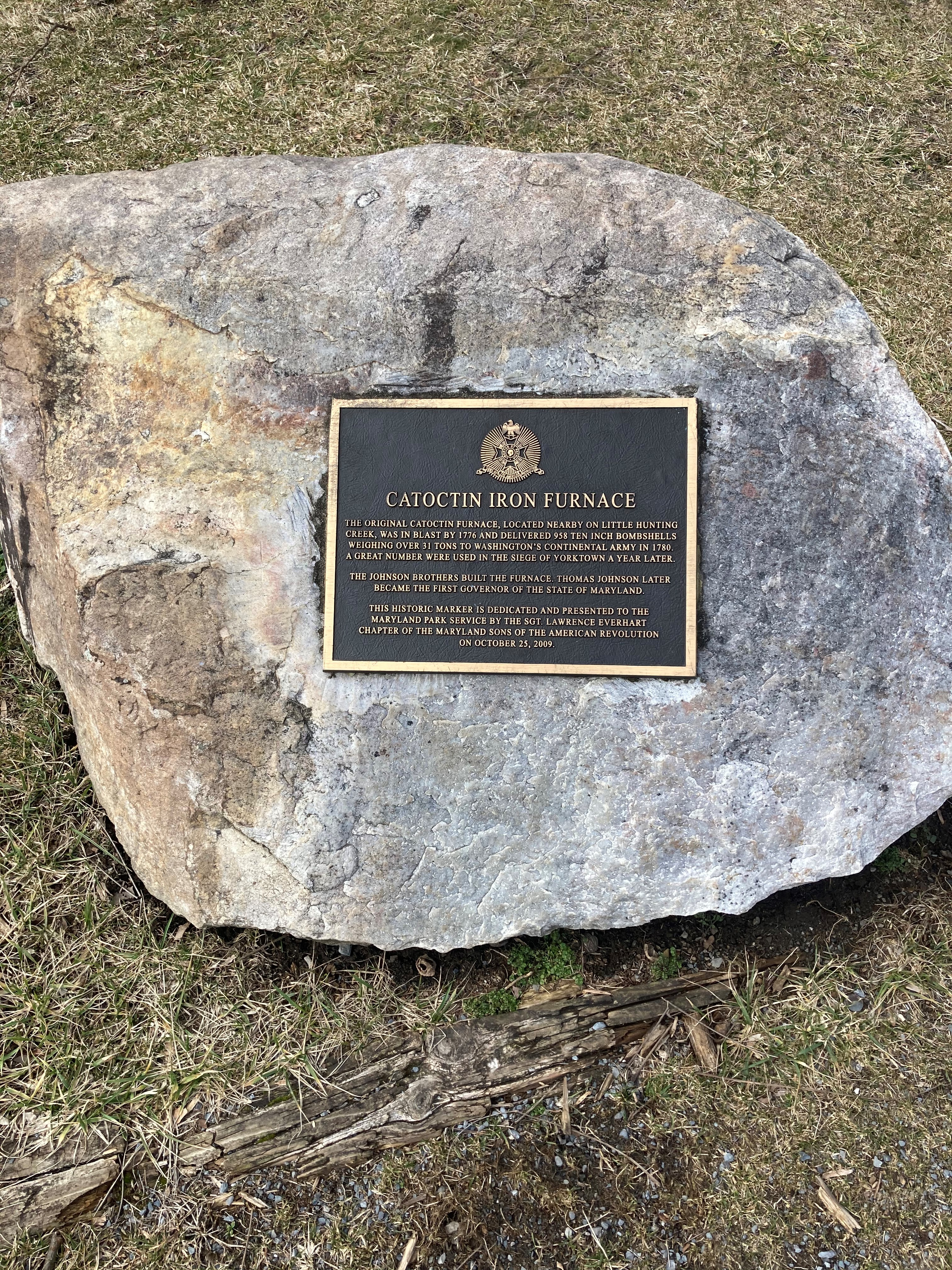
Catoctin Furnace Stone, March 2021

The furnace's remains are located in Cunningham Falls State Park. A walking-tour handout is available in the park's visitor center.

In 1973, the Catoctin Furnace Historical Society, Inc. was formed by G. Eugene Anderson, Clement E. Gardiner, J. Franklin Mentzer, and Earl M. Shankle to “foster and promote the restoration of the Catoctin Furnace Historic District…and to maintain the same exclusively for educational and scientific purposes…to exhibit to coming generations our heritage of the past…” The Catoctin Furnace Historical Society, Inc., celebrates, studies, and preserves the rich history of this pre-revolutionary industrial village, including the architecture, cultural landscapes, lifeways, and foodways of the workers.

== See also ==
- Catoctin Mountain
- Cunningham Falls State Park
- Thomas Johnson (jurist)
