= John Roberts Supreme Court nominations =

United States Supreme Court nomination

In July 2005, President George W. Bush nominated John Roberts to succeed retiring Associate Justice Sandra Day O'Connor. However, following the death of Chief Justice of the United States William Rehnquist, that still-pending nomination was withdrawn. On September 5, 2005, President Bush announced that he would nominate Roberts to succeed Rehnquist as Chief Justice instead.

The Senate Judiciary Committee commenced hearings on Roberts's nomination to serve as Chief Justice on September 12, 2005. Later that month, on September 29, Roberts was confirmed by the Senate as the 17th Chief Justice by a 78–22 vote. He took the Constitutional oath of office, administered by Associate Justice John Paul Stevens at the White House, that same day. On October 3, he took the judicial oath provided for by the Judiciary Act of 1789 at the United States Supreme Court building, prior to the first oral arguments of the 2005 term.

At the time of his nominations, Roberts was serving as a judge of the United States Court of Appeals for the District of Columbia Circuit. He was appointed to that position in 2003 by President George W. Bush.

== Associate Justice nomination ==
John Roberts nomination to be an Associate Justice on the U.S. Supreme Court
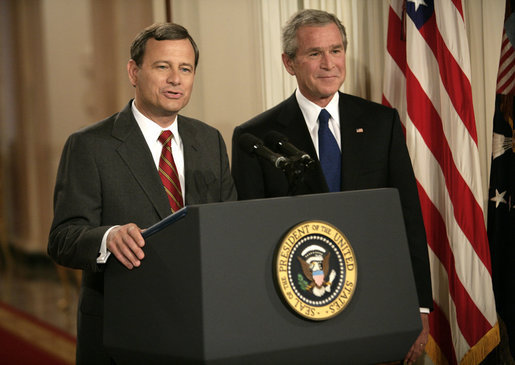
- Roberts, accompanied by President Bush, at the announcement of the nomination
- Nominee: John Roberts
- Nominated by: George W. Bush (President of the United States)
- Succeeding: Sandra Day O'Connor (Associate Justice)
- Date nominated: July 19, 2005 (announced); July 29, 2005 (formally nominated)
- Date withdrawn: September 6, 2005
- Outcome: Nomination withdrawn; Roberts instead nominated for Chief Justice

On July 19, 2005, it was announced by President George W. Bush that he intended to nominate John Roberts to be an Associate Justice on the Supreme Court of the United States to succeed Associate Justice Sandra Day O'Connor. Roberts was formally nominated on July 29, and the nomination was referred to the Senate Judiciary Committee the same day.

Former senator Fred Thompson and former Republican National Committee chairman Ed Gillespie were tasked to serve as Roberts's confirmation "sherpas", advisors tasked with guiding him through the rigors of his confirmation.

=== Assessment by the American Bar Association ===
The professional qualifications (integrity, professional competence and judicial temperament) of nominees to the Supreme Court are evaluated by the American Bar Association's 15-member Standing Committee on Federal Judiciary, which offers a rating of "well qualified," "qualified," or "not qualified." The opinions of the committee bind neither the president nor the Senate; however, they are generally taken into account. On August 17, the ABA committee unanimously gave Roberts a "well qualified" rating. The positive review of Roberts's qualifications for the Court came amid an ongoing dispute between the White House and the ABA over the association's role in vetting judicial candidates.

=== Controversies ===
While Roberts was under consideration for the associate judgeship, a number of controversies related to the nomination arose.

==== Adoption records ====
While investigating Roberts' life, the New York Times was accused of attempting to unseal records detailing the 2000 adoption by Roberts and his wife of two infants born in Ireland via a Latin American country. The Times denied any attempts to unseal legal records and stated that "[o]ur reporters made initial inquiries about the adoptions" and "[t]hey did so with great care, understanding the sensitivity of the issue."

The Times was condemned by the National Council for Adoption, "NCFA denounces, in the strongest possible terms, the shocking decision of the New York Times to investigate the adoption records of Justice John Roberts' two young children. The adoption community is outraged that, for obviously political reasons, the Times has targeted the very private circumstances, motivations, and processes by which the Roberts became parents."

The reasons for the adoption happening in the unnamed Latin American country remain unclear, though it was noted that the Irish 1991 Adoption Act only allows adoption of children born in Ireland by people resident in Ireland.

==== Federalist Society involvement ====
Judge Roberts has stated that he cannot recall ever having been a member of the Federalist Society. He sought and received published corrections from several major news organizations retracting earlier reports that he had been a member. On July 25, 2005, however, The Washington Post reported that John Roberts is listed in the Society's 1997–1998 leadership directory as serving on the Steering Committee of the Federalist Society. The same source also indicates the possibility that the individuals listed in the "leadership directory" are, in a technical sense, not necessarily "members" of the society, and no confirmable membership information is officially disclosed by the Society itself.

==== 2000 presidential election activities ====
While an attorney at Hogan & Hartson, Roberts met with Florida Governor Jeb Bush and gave advice on the legal aspects of election disputes during the Florida recount of 2000. According to Ted Cruz, an advisor on Bush's 2000 campaign, Roberts helped polish some legal briefs and held a "moot court" session to prepare Bush's lawyers for arguments in Bush v. Palm Beach County Canvassing Board and Bush v. Gore.

==== Advertisement by NARAL ====
On August 10, 2005, NARAL Pro-Choice America, an advocate for legal abortion, aired controversial advertisements featuring Emily Lyons, an abortion clinic director who was injured in the Eric Rudolph clinic bombing in 1998. The ad alleged that

Supreme Court nominee John Roberts filed court briefs supporting violent fringe groups and a convicted clinic bomber... America can't afford a justice whose ideology leads him to excuse violence against other Americans.

The ads ran only in Maine and Rhode Island, the home states of moderate Republican Senators Olympia Snowe, Susan Collins and Lincoln Chafee.

The brief, which was filed almost seven years before the bombing of Lyons' clinic and which dealt with obstructing access to clinics, not bombings, argued that while abortion protesters from Operation Rescue could not be prosecuted under the 1871 Federal Ku Klux Klan Act for discrimination, they had violated state law by trespassing. Ultimately, the Supreme Court agreed, ruling 6 to 3 in Bray v. Alexandria Women's Health Clinic that opposition to abortion did not constitute discrimination against women "as is evident from the fact that men and women are on both sides of the issue, just as men and women are on both sides of petitioners' unlawful demonstrations."

Even before the ad was shown on television, White House spokesman Steve Schmidt responded to them, describing the claims as "outrageously false, bordering on the slanderous." While Roberts in his amicus brief for the Government, argued that abortion protestors could not be prosecuted federally for discrimination, he pointed out that the defendants obstruction was illegal under Virginia law. Further, Roberts has argued in a Reagan administration memo that violence such as bombings had no protection under the law: "No matter how lofty or sincerely held the goal, those who resort to violence to achieve it are criminals," he wrote. NARAL was unimpressed with this memo, arguing that it was not an official action like his amicus brief.

NARAL argued that "This wasn't an arcane legal dispute, but a fight over whether or not law enforcement could use their most effective weapon [the Klan Act] against extremists who use violence." After the Bray decision, Congress passed the Freedom of Access to Clinic Entrances Act, which criminalized obstructing access to abortion clinics at the Federal level, effectively replacing the Klan Act with an even more effective legal weapon against those that obstructed access to clinics. National Review Online argued that "The fact that this law failed to deter the 1998 bombing that injured the clinic worker featured in NARAL's ad makes it all the more ludicrous to suggest that Roberts's proper reading of the Ku Klux Klan Act of 1871 in 1991 is somehow responsible." In the face of intense criticism even among supporters of legal abortion, NARAL eventually withdrew the ads.

== White House announcement of intention to instead nominate Roberts as Chief Justice ==
President George W. Bush announced that he would nominate Judge John Roberts as the Supreme Court's 17th chief justice on September 5, 2005, two days after the death of Chief Justice William Rehnquist, and five weeks after selecting him for appointment to succeed O'Connor as associate justice. The following day, Bush officially nominated Roberts to be the next Chief Justice, and simultaneously withdrew Roberts's still-pending Associate Justice nomination. Confirmation hearings on the Roberts Associate Justice nomination, set to begin on September 6, were canceled, and rescheduled hearings, for his Chief Justice nomination, began on September 12.

When announcing Roberts's nomination, Bush noted that the Court's next term began in but a few weeks (October 3), stating, "It is in the interest of the court and the country to have a Chief Justice on the bench on the first full day of the fall term." He went on to say, "The Senate is well along in the process of considering Judge Roberts's qualifications. They know his record and his fidelity to the law. I'm confident that the Senate can complete hearings and confirm him as chief justice within a month." Senate Democrats vowed to put Roberts under greater scrutiny now that he was being nominated for chief justice, but gave no indication that his nomination faced any significant difficulties. The Senate Majority Leader, Republican Bill Frist, anticipated no problems, saying, "I still expect Judge Roberts to be confirmed before the Supreme Court starts its new term on October 3."

No hearings nor votes had yet been held by the Judiciary Committee on Roberts' nomination before this announcement was made.

== Chief Justice nomination ==
John Roberts nomination as Chief Justice of the United States Supreme Court
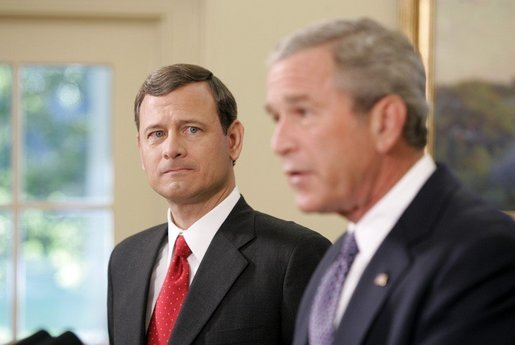
- President Bush, accompanied by Roberts, announces his intention to nominate Roberts as Chief Justice on September 5, 2005 in the Oval Office of the White House
- Nominee: John Roberts
- Nominated by: George W. Bush (president of the United States)
- Succeeding: William H. Rehnquist (Chief Justice)
- Date nominated: September 5, 2005 (announced); September 6, 2005 (formally nominated)
- Date confirmed: September 29, 2005
- Outcome: Approved by the U.S. Senate

Vote of the Senate Judiciary Committee
- Votes in favor: 13
- Votes against: 5
- Result: Reported favorably

Senate confirmation vote
- Votes in favor: 78
- Votes against: 22
- Result: Confirmed

Roberts' nomination for Associate Justice was withdrawn on September 6, 2005, and he was formally nominated to serve as Chief Justice.

=== Confirmation hearings ===
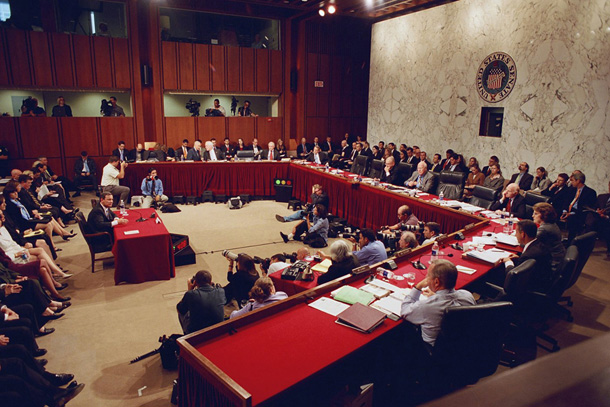
Senate Judiciary Committee confirmation hearings of John Roberts to be Chief Justice of the United States in September 2005

Senate Judiciary Committee Chairman Arlen Specter had called for a final vote by the committee on or before September 15, but Rehnquist's death and the renomination of Roberts for Chief Justice caused a delay in the first round of questioning, each Senator having 30 minutes to query the nominee. During the course of the day, Roberts answered questions from 16 of the 18 committee members, on a variety of topics. He affirmed his commitment to a constitutional right to privacy, clarified his position on civil rights during wartime, and took a conservative position on the use of international law in interpreting the U.S. Constitution.

On September 14, the hearing resumed at 9:00 a.m., with the completion of the first round of questioning, followed by the start of the second round of questioning. Questioning did not finish this day, and was scheduled to be continued the next day.

On September 15, the hearing again resumed at 9:00 a.m., with the completion of the final round of questioning of Roberts. Later, the committee went into private session to discuss FBI reports on the nominee, a standard procedure followed for all nominees to federal courts. Following this, the committee heard testimony from the American Bar Association and six panels of various witnesses for the remainder of the afternoon and into early evening. The hearings were adjourned with 24 hours to remain for committee members to submit written questions to Roberts, which were to be answered by him as thoroughly as practicable.

==== Questions and answers ====
During Judge William H. Pryor's confirmation hearings for a federal bench in Atlanta, Senator Charles Schumer said he was troubled by Pryor's "deeply held personal beliefs". There were predictions by some, notably the Catholic League for Civil and Religious Rights, Notre Dame law professor Charles Rice in the National Review, the Center for Jewish Values, and the Catholic organization Fidelis that the pattern would be repeated with Roberts' confirmation hearing. Most Rev. Charles Chaput, OFM Cap, Archbishop of Denver, noted that "many people already believe that a new kind of religious discrimination is very welcome at the Capitol, even among elected officials who claim to be Catholic," concluding that "the bias against 'papism' is alive and well in America." However, others did not interpret the clause as prohibiting Senate inquiry into the religious beliefs of a nominee; rather they held that religious inquiries by the Senate are not the application of a religious Test (or disqualification), but a valid form of inquiry into Roberts' source of values and beliefs, which they consider to be highly relevant to a position such as Supreme Court Justice.

On September 13, during the second day of confirmation hearings Senator Arlen Specter asked Roberts whether his faith would affect his opinions on the bench. Roberts responded that "there is nothing in my personal view based on faith or other sources that would prevent me from applying the precedents of the court faithfully in accord with the principles of stare decisis." Later the same day, he also said "my faith and my religious beliefs do not play a role in my judging. ... I look to the law. I do not look to the Bible or other religious books." On September 14, Senator Dianne Feinstein asked Roberts about the "role Catholicism would play" in his tenure as a justice. Roberts declined to endorse President Kennedy's statement that "separation of church and state is absolute," telling Feinstein, "I don't know what you mean by 'absolute'." Some consider such questioning to be a revival of anti-Catholic bigotry reminiscent of the public concern about Catholic influence that presidential candidate John F. Kennedy faced in 1960, and exemplified by the controversial Blaine Amendments.

=== Judiciary Committee recommendation ===
On September 22, 2005, the Senate Judiciary Committee voted 13–5 to send the Roberts nomination to the full Senate with a recommendation that it be confirmed. Roberts garnered the votes of all 10 Republicans on the committee and of three Democrats: Patrick Leahy, Herb Kohl and Russ Feingold.

=== Confirmation vote ===
John Roberts was confirmed as chief justice on September 29, 2005, by a commanding majority, 78–22, of the Senate. All 55 Republicans voted "yes", as did 22 Democrats, and one independent; voting "no" were 22 Democrats. Later that same day, the 50-year-old Roberts was given the general Constitutional oath by the senior Associate Justice, John Paul Stevens, in a ceremony at the White House. Prior to the ceremony, President Bush said, "The Senate has confirmed a man with an astute mind and a kind heart." On October 3, he took the prescribed judicial oath at the United States Supreme Court Building, becoming the first new Supreme Court justice in 11 years, and the youngest to become Chief Justice since John Marshall, who was confirmed in 1801 at age 45. After Roberts was sworn in, the era of the Roberts Court began, with Chief Justice Roberts, and Associate Justices Stevens, O'Connor, Antonin Scalia, Anthony Kennedy, David Souter, Clarence Thomas, Ruth Bader Ginsburg, and Stephen Breyer.

Vote to confirm the Roberts nomination
September 29, 2005	Party			Total votes
September 29, 2005	Democratic	Republican	Independent	Total votes
Yea	22	55	1	78
Nay	22	0	0	22
Result: Confirmed
Roll call vote on the nomination: Senator / Party / State / Vote; Daniel Akaka / D / Hawaii / Nay; Lamar Alexander / R / Tennessee / Yea; Wayne Allard / R / Colorado / Yea; George Allen / R / Virginia / Yea; Max Baucus / D / Montana / Yea; Evan Bayh / D / Indiana / Nay; Robert Bennett / R / Utah / Yea; Joe Biden / D / Delaware / Nay; Jeff Bingaman / D / New Mexico / Yea; Kit Bond / R / Missouri / Yea; Barbara Boxer / D / California / Nay; Sam Brownback / R / Kansas / Yea; Jim Bunning / R / Kentucky / Yea; Conrad Burns / R / Montana / Yea; Richard Burr / R / North Carolina / Yea; Robert Byrd / D / West Virginia / Yea; Maria Cantwell / D / Washington / Nay; Tom Carper / D / Delaware / Yea; Lincoln Chafee / R / Rhode Island / Yea; Saxby Chambliss / R / Georgia / Yea; Hillary Clinton / D / New York / Nay; Tom Coburn / R / Oklahoma / Yea; Thad Cochran / R / Mississippi / Yea; Norm Coleman / R / Minnesota / Yea; Susan Collins / R / Maine / Yea; Kent Conrad / D / North Dakota / Yea; John Cornyn / R / Texas / Yea; Jon Corzine / D / New Jersey / Nay; Larry Craig / R / Idaho / Yea; Mike Crapo / R / Idaho / Yea; Mark Dayton / D / Minnesota / Nay; Jim DeMint / R / South Carolina / Yea; Mike DeWine / R / Ohio / Yea; Christopher Dodd / D / Connecticut / Yea; Elizabeth Dole / R / North Carolina / Yea; Pete Domenici / R / New Mexico / Yea; Byron Dorgan / D / North Dakota / Yea; Dick Durbin / D / Illinois / Nay; John Ensign / R / Nevada / Yea; Mike Enzi / R / Wyoming / Yea; Russ Feingold / D / Wisconsin / Yea; Dianne Feinstein / D / California / Nay; Bill Frist / R / Tennessee / Yea; Lindsey Graham / R / South Carolina / Yea; Chuck Grassley / R / Iowa / Yea; Judd Gregg / R / New Hampshire / Yea; Chuck Hagel / R / Nebraska / Yea; Tom Harkin / D / Iowa / Nay; Orrin Hatch / R / Utah / Yea; Kay Bailey Hutchison / R / Texas / Yea; Jim Inhofe / R / Oklahoma / Yea; Daniel Inouye / D / Hawaii / Nay; Johnny Isakson / R / Georgia / Yea; Jim Jeffords / I / Vermont / Yea; Tim Johnson / D / South Dakota / Yea; Ted Kennedy / D / Massachusetts / Nay; John Kerry / D / Massachusetts / Nay; Herb Kohl / D / Wisconsin / Yea; Jon Kyl / R / Arizona / Yea; Mary Landrieu / D / Louisiana / Yea; Frank Lautenberg / D / New Jersey / Nay; Patrick Leahy / D / Vermont / Yea; Carl Levin / D / Michigan / Yea; Joe Lieberman / D / Connecticut / Yea; Blanche Lincoln / D / Arkansas / Yea; Trent Lott / R / Mississippi / Yea; Richard Lugar / R / Indiana / Yea; Mel Martínez / R / Florida / Yea; John McCain / R / Arizona / Yea; Mitch McConnell / R / Kentucky / Yea; Barbara Mikulski / D / Maryland / Nay; Lisa Murkowski / R / Alaska / Yea; Patty Murray / D / Washington / Yea; Ben Nelson / D / Nebraska / Yea; Bill Nelson / D / Florida / Yea; Barack Obama / D / Illinois / Nay; Mark Pryor / D / Arkansas / Yea; Jack Reed / D / Rhode Island / Nay; Harry Reid / D / Nevada / Nay; Pat Roberts / R / Kansas / Yea; Jay Rockefeller / D / West Virginia / Yea; Ken Salazar / D / Colorado / Yea; Rick Santorum / R / Pennsylvania / Yea; Paul Sarbanes / D / Maryland / Nay; Chuck Schumer / D / New York / Nay; Jeff Sessions / R / Alabama / Yea; Richard Shelby / R / Alabama / Yea; Gordon H. Smith / R / Oregon / Yea; Olympia Snowe / R / Maine / Yea; Arlen Specter / R / Pennsylvania / Yea; Debbie Stabenow / D / Michigan / Nay; Ted Stevens / R / Alaska / Yea; John E. Sununu / R / New Hampshire / Yea; Jim Talent / R / Missouri / Yea; Craig L. Thomas / R / Wyoming / Yea; John Thune / R / South Dakota / Yea; David Vitter / R / Louisiana / Yea; George Voinovich / R / Ohio / Yea; John Warner / R / Virginia / Yea; Ron Wyden / D / Oregon / Yea; Sources:

== See also ==
- George W. Bush Supreme Court candidates
- Roberts Court
