= Illinois-Wabash Company =

American colonial land company

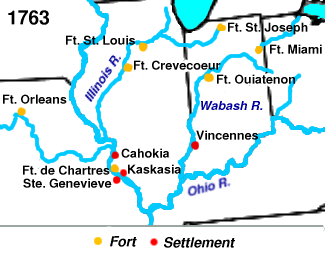
The Illinois Country at the end of the French and Indian War, showing French settlements and forts as well as current U.S. state boundaries. Not shown are the many Native American villages.

The Illinois-Wabash Company, formally known as the United Illinois and Wabash Land Company, was a company formed in 1779 (247 years ago) from the merger of the Illinois Company and the Wabash Company. The two companies had been established in order to purchase land from Native Americans in the Illinois Country, a region of North America acquired by Great Britain in 1763. The Illinois Company purchased two large tracts of land in 1773; the Wabash Company purchased two additional tracts in 1775.

Because the Royal Proclamation of 1763 forbade private purchase of Native American lands, Great Britain refused to recognize these transactions. Following the outbreak of the American Revolutionary War, officials of the merged Illinois-Wabash Company appealed to both Virginia (which claimed the Illinois Country) and to the United States to recognize their land purchases but were unsuccessful. After the United States bought the land in question from Native Americans and resold it, the matter eventually went to the Supreme Court of the United States. In Johnson v. McIntosh (1823), the Court ruled that the U.S. government, following earlier British precedent, would not recognize private purchases of native lands, and that Illinois-Wabash Company's purchases were therefore invalid.

== Land purchases and British denial of title ==
In the middle of the 18th century, merchants and land speculators in the British Empire were looking to expand beyond the Appalachian Mountains into the interior of North America. Companies such as the Ohio Company of Virginia had been formed for this purpose, but rivalry between the British and the French for access to the region led to the outbreak of the French and Indian War (1754–1763), interrupting the activities of the companies. After the British victory in the war, the Crown issued the Royal Proclamation of 1763, which sought to organize and stabilize the vast new territory won from France. In order to prevent the conditions which had produced the war and its sequel, Pontiac's Rebellion (1763–1766), the British government forbade private individuals or companies from purchasing land from American Indians. Thereafter, only royal officials would be permitted to conduct treaties in order to buy Native American lands.

In 1768, a group of prominent merchants from Philadelphia began doing business in the Illinois Country, selling provisions to American Indians and British troops. In 1773, William Murray, the merchants' agent in Illinois, learned of a British legal opinion known as the Camden-Yorke Opinion. This opinion made quite an impact in North America because it was interpreted by some to suggest that private purchases of land from American Indians would now be recognized by the British Crown. With this in mind, Murray and his Philadelphia employers organized the Illinois Company and, on 5 July 1773, purchased two tracts of land from the Kaskaskia, Peoria, and Cahokia tribes.

British officials refused to recognize the legality of the Illinois Company's purchase–the interpretation of Camden-Yorke circulating in America had been misleading. In April 1774, Murray turned to his kinsman, Lord Dunmore, the Royal Governor of Virginia. Dunmore agreed to lend support to the company's purchases in exchange for a piece of the action. Murray then formed the Wabash Company with Lord Dunmore as a member. On October 18, 1775, an agent for the Wabash Company purchased two tracts of land along the Wabash River from the Piankeshaw tribe called the 'Piankeshaw Deed'. Soon after the outbreak of the American Revolutionary War, however, Dunmore was forced to flee Virginia, and the companies were compelled to turn to new officials for recognition of its purchases.

== Merger and American denial of title ==
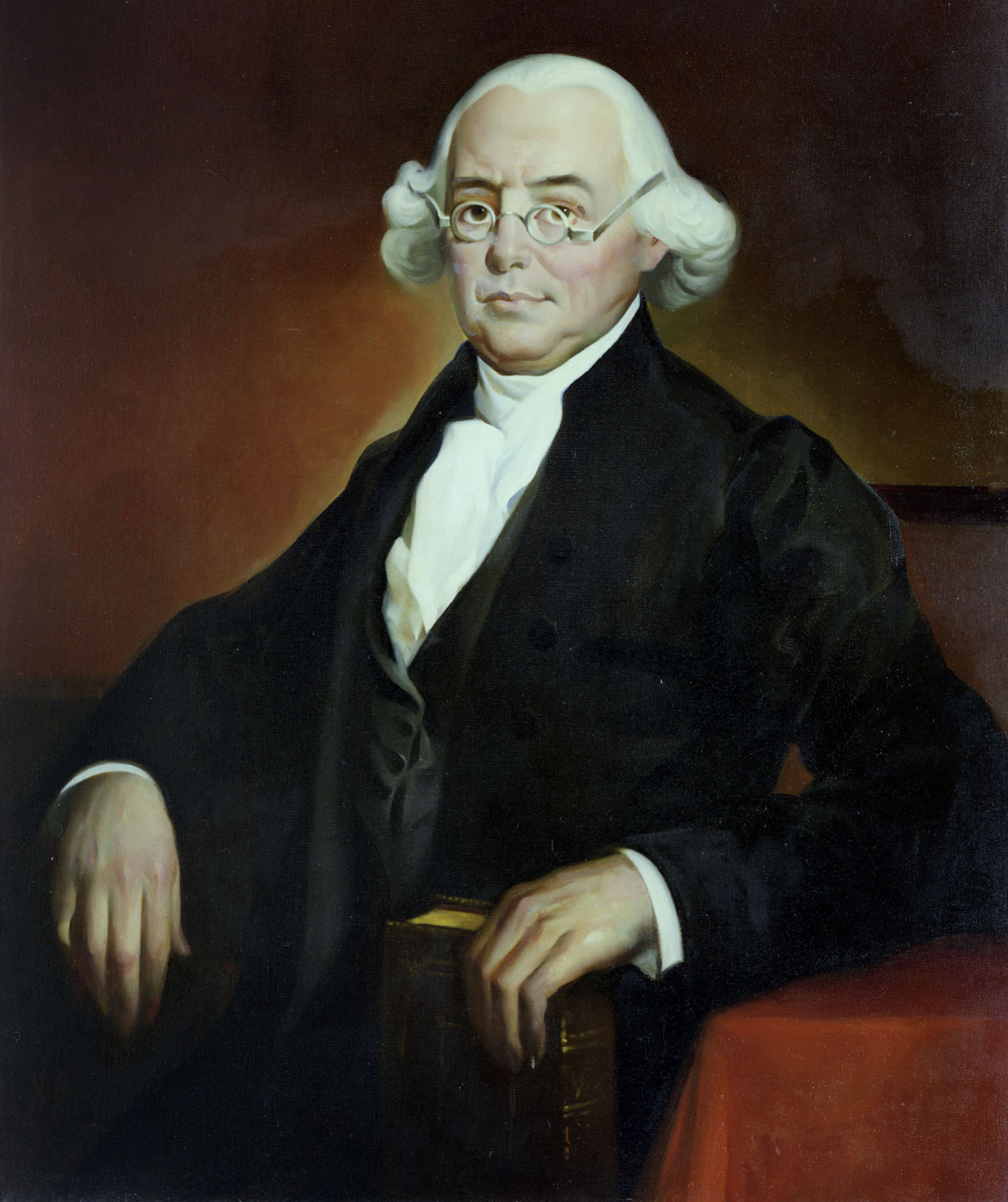
Founding Father James Wilson unsuccessfully advocated the interests of the United Illinois and Wabash Land Company.

During the war the British had sparsely garrisoned the Illinois Country, which was far away from the main area of action. In July 1778, Colonel George Rogers Clark and a small force took possession of the region on behalf of Virginia, which, by virtue of its colonial charter, had a claim to the entire Illinois Country. In December of that year, Murray presented a memorial to the Virginia legislature, informing them of the land claims of the Illinois and Wabash companies. In order to consolidate their lobbying efforts, the two companies merged on March 13, 1779, becoming the United Illinois and Wabash Land Company. The cause of the company was promoted by influential Americans such as James Wilson and Robert Morris, who had become investors. Other notable members included Silas Deane, Samuel Chase, and Maryland governor Thomas Johnson.

Despite these political connections, Virginia declined to recognize the Illinois-Wabash purchases and instead created the "County of Illinois" in November 1779. Thus rejected, the company turned its efforts to lobbying the new national government of the United States. This issue became part of a wider debate in Congress about the western boundaries of states, with the states without western lands demanding that Virginia and other states with large land claims cede these lands to the national government. Virginia ceded her western land claims to the United States in 1784. Despite repeated appeals by the Illinois-Wabash Company, which were regularly renewed into the early 19th century, the U.S. government declined to recognize their land claims. The company faded away.

The United States eventually bought the lands in question from Native Americans in treaties conducted by William Henry Harrison. After the War of 1812, the United States began to issue land patents to settlers. In 1820, the executor of the estate of an investor in the Illinois-Wabash Company filed suit against William McIntosh, one of the largest of the new landowners. The lawsuit claimed that McIntosh had bought land rightfully owned by the Illinois-Wabash Company, based on the earlier purchase from the Indians. In 1823, the issue made its way to the U.S. Supreme Court in Johnson v. McIntosh. The Court decided in favor of McIntosh, ruling that private purchases of native lands were not valid. The decision brought to an end the story of the Illinois-Wabash Company.
