= 1788 Maryland gubernatorial election =

- November 10, 1788
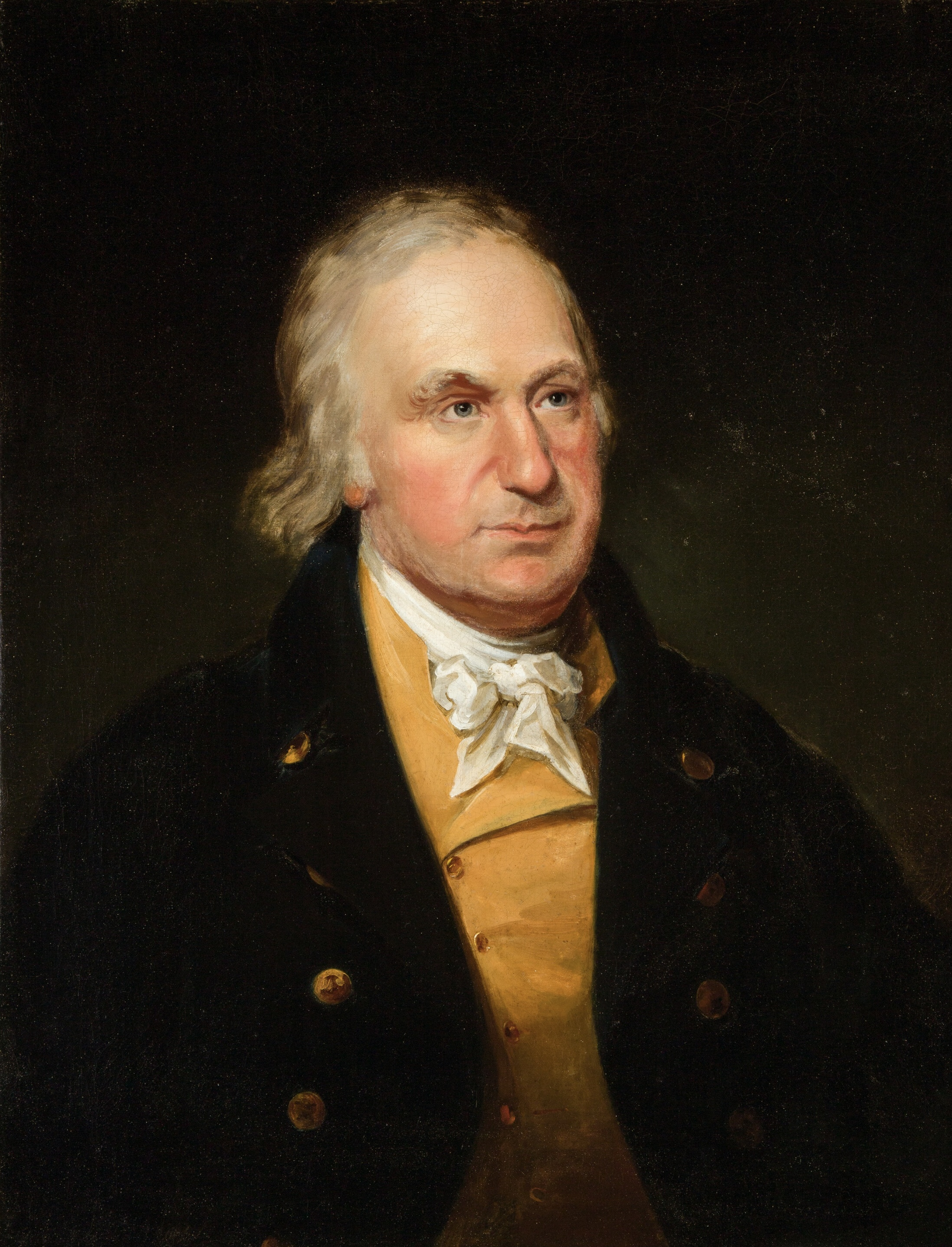

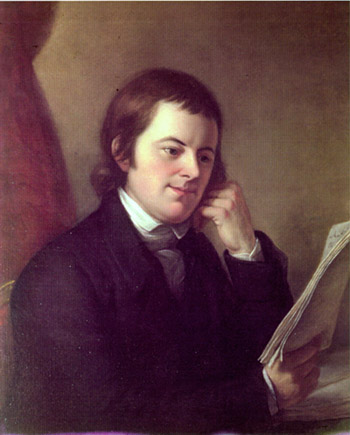
Nominee	John Eager Howard	Thomas Johnson
Party	Federalist	Federalist
Popular vote	1	0
Percentage	100.00%	0.00%
Governor before election
William Smallwood
Nonpartisan
Elected Governor
John Eager Howard
Federalist

The 1788 Maryland gubernatorial election was held on November 10, 1788, in order to elect the Governor of Maryland. Federalist candidate John Eager Howard was elected by the Maryland General Assembly against his opponent, fellow Federalist candidate and former Governor Thomas Johnson. The exact results of this election are unknown.

== General election ==
On election day, November 10, 1788, Federalist candidate John Eager Howard was elected by the Maryland General Assembly, thereby gaining Federalist control over the office of governor. Howard was sworn in as the 5th Governor of Maryland on November 24, 1788.

=== Results ===
Maryland gubernatorial election, 1788
Party	Candidate	Votes	%
Federalist	John Eager Howard	1	100.00
Federalist	Thomas Johnson	0	0.00
Total votes		1	100.00
Federalist gain from Nonpartisan			
