= Nomination and confirmation to the Supreme Court of the United States =

Political process

The nomination and confirmation of justices to the Supreme Court of the United States involves several steps, the framework for which is set forth in the United States Constitution. Specifically, Article II, Section 2, Clause 2, provides that the president of the United States nominates a justice and that the United States Senate provides advice and consent before the person is formally appointed to the Court. It also empowers a president to temporarily, under certain circumstances, fill a Supreme Court vacancy by means of a recess appointment. The Constitution does not set any qualifications for service as a justice, thus the president may nominate any individual to serve on the Court.

In modern practice, Supreme Court nominations are first referred to the Senate Judiciary Committee before being considered by the full Senate. Since the late 1960s, the committee's examination of a Supreme Court nominee almost always has consisted of three parts: a pre-hearing investigation, followed by public hearings in which both the nominee and other witnesses make statements and answer questions, and concluding with a committee decision on what recommendation to make to the full Senate (favorable, unfavorable or no recommendation). Once that recommendation is reported to the Senate, floor debate can begin ahead of a confirmation vote. A simple majority vote is needed for confirmation.

The process for replacing a Supreme Court justice attracts considerable public attention and is closely scrutinized. Typically, the whole process takes several months, but it can be, and on occasion has been, completed more quickly. Since the mid 1950s, the average time from nomination to final Senate vote has been about 55 days. Presidents generally select a nominee a few weeks after a vacancy occurs or a retirement is announced. The number of hours each nominee has spent before the Senate Judiciary Committee for public testimony has varied; the six nominees who have appeared before the committee since 2005 spent between 17 and 32-plus hours testifying.

== Constitutional background ==
The Appointments Clause in Article II, Section 2, Clause 2 of the United States Constitution empowers the President of the United States to nominate and, with the confirmation (advice and consent) of the United States Senate, to appoint public officials, including justices of the United States Supreme Court. This clause, commonly known as the Appointments Clause, is one example of the system of checks and balances inherent in the Constitution. The president has the plenary power to nominate and to appoint, while the Senate possesses the plenary power to reject or confirm the nominee prior to their appointment.

Alexander Hamilton wrote about the way the Constitution allocates the power of appointment in The Federalist No. 76 (1778). The president, he asserted, should have the sole power to nominate because "one man of discernment is better fitted to analyze and estimate the peculiar qualities adapted to particular offices, than a body of men of equal, or perhaps even of superior discernment." And, requiring the cooperation of the Senate would, he contended, "have a powerful, though, in general, a silent operation. It would be an excellent check upon a spirit of favoritism in the President, and would tend greatly to preventing the appointment of unfit characters from State prejudice, from family connection, from personal attachment, or from a view to popularity. In addition to this, it would be an efficacious source of stability in the administration."

== Nomination ==
=== Nominee selection ===
White House staff members typically handle the vetting and recommending of potential Supreme Court nominees. In practice, the task of conducting background research on and preparing profiles of possible candidates for the Supreme Court is among the first taken on by an incoming president's staff, vacancy or not. As there was a Supreme Court vacancy at the time of the 2016 presidential campaign, advisors to then-candidate Donald Trump developed, and Trump made public, two lists of potential Supreme Court nominees.

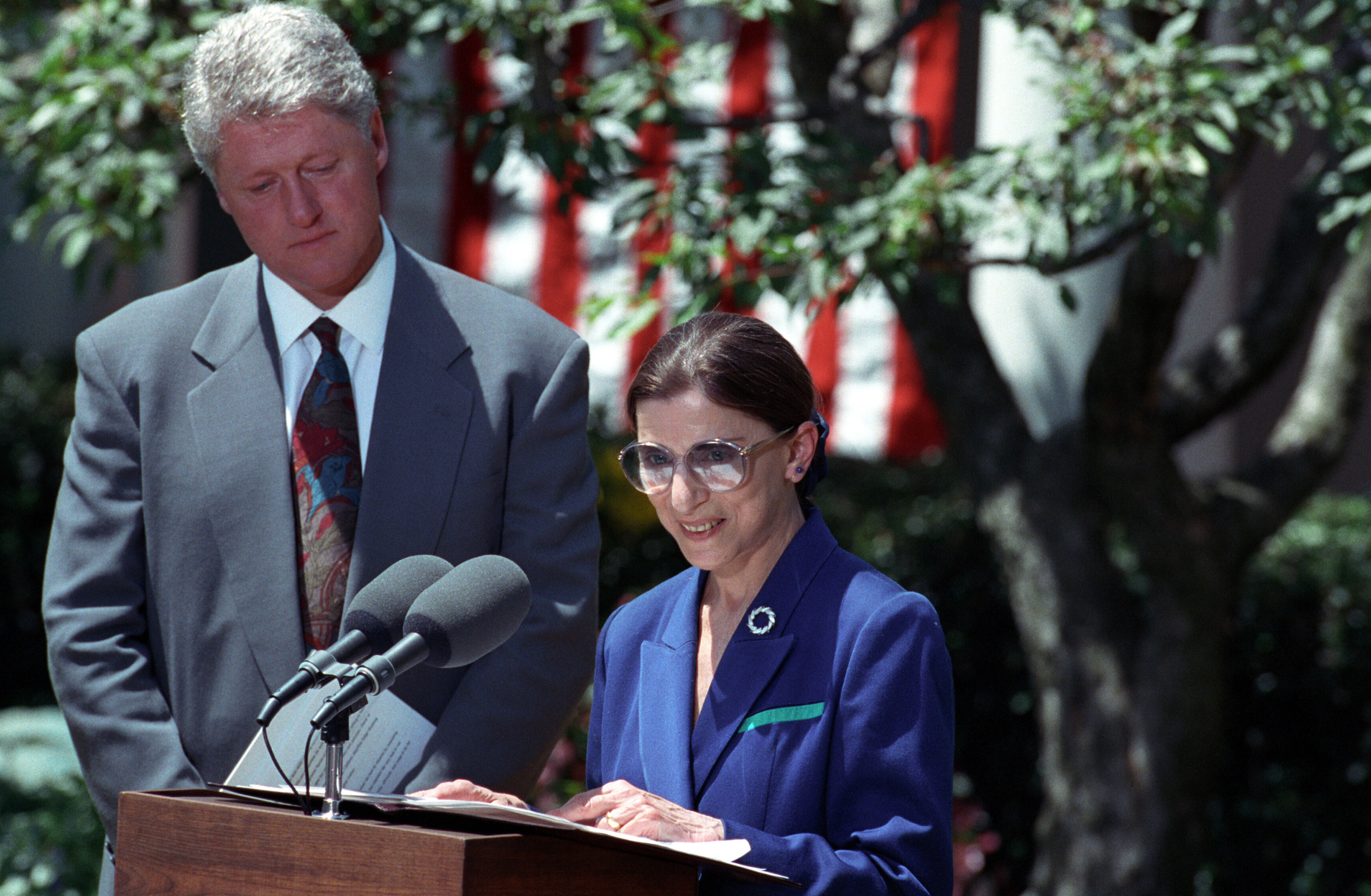
Ruth Bader Ginsburg officially accepting the nomination as associate justice from President Bill Clinton on June 14, 1993

Once a Supreme Court vacancy opens, the president discusses the candidates with advisors, Senate leaders and members of the Senate Judiciary Committee, as a matter of senatorial courtesy, before selecting a nominee. In doing so, potential problems a nominee may face during confirmation can be addressed in advance. This can also be an opportunity for senators to advise the president, though the president is not obliged to take their advice on whom to nominate, neither does the Senate have the authority to set qualifications or otherwise limit who the president may select.

As the president considers who to nominate, formal investigations into the backgrounds of prospective nominees are conducted. In recent decades this process has involved both an inquiry into the public record and professional credentials of persons under consideration, and an inquiry into the private background of potential candidates. The former is usually conducted by senior White House aides in consultation with the Justice Department. The latter is conducted by the Federal Bureau of Investigation. The goal of these inquiries is to ensure that a nominee has nothing in their background that would prove embarrassing or would otherwise put confirmation in jeopardy.

As the president prepares to announce their selection, a former senator of the president's party is selected to serve as the nominee's "sherpa", their guide through the process. When ready, the president publicly announces the selection, with the nominee present. Shortly thereafter, the nomination then is formally submitted to the Senate. Once that has been done, it is customary for a nominee to meet with senators while also preparing for confirmation hearings.

How quickly a president selects a nominee has varied from president to president and from instance to instance. For the 14 vacancies since 1975 that required only one nomination prior to being filled, the average length of time between the date it was publicly known that a justice was leaving the court (or had died) and the date on which the president publicly identified a nominee for the vacancy was about 19 days.

=== Criteria ===
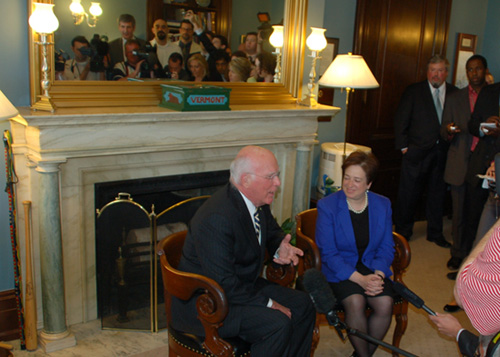
Associate justice nominee Elena Kagan meets with Senator Patrick Leahy on May 12, 2010, prior to the start of her confirmation hearings

The Appointments Clause does not set qualifications for being a Supreme Court justice (e.g. age, citizenship or admission to the bar) nor does it describe the intellectual or temperamental qualities that justices should possess. As a result, each president has had their own criteria for selecting individuals to fill Supreme Court vacancies. While specific motives vary from president to president and situation to situation, the motivations behind the choices made can be grouped into two general categories: professional qualifications criteria and political / public policy criteria.

Most presidents have intentionally sought out nominees with solid legal qualifications, persons with a distinguished reputation or expertise in a particular area of the law, or who is highly regarded for their public service. As a result, many nominees have had prior experience as lower court judges, legal scholars, or private practitioners, or have served as Members of Congress, as federal administrators, or as governors. Even though neither the Constitution nor federal law requires that a Supreme Court justice be a lawyer, every person nominated to the Court to date has been.

Most presidents have nominated individuals who broadly share their political views or ideological philosophy. During the 20th century for example, Franklin D. Roosevelt chose people who he believed would affirm his New Deal programs. Similarly, John F. Kennedy and Lyndon B. Johnson chose people who they anticipated would support their respective New Frontier and Great Society initiatives. Ronald Reagan chose conservative jurists, people he believed would further his goal of undoing the activism of the Warren and Burger Courts.

On occasion, a justice's decisions may be contrary to what the nominating president anticipated. One such justice was David Souter, who was nominated by George H. W. Bush. When nominated, he was not well known and had no paper trail whatsoever. Many pundits and politicians at the time expected Souter to be a conservative; however, after becoming a justice, his opinions generally fell on the liberal side of the political spectrum.

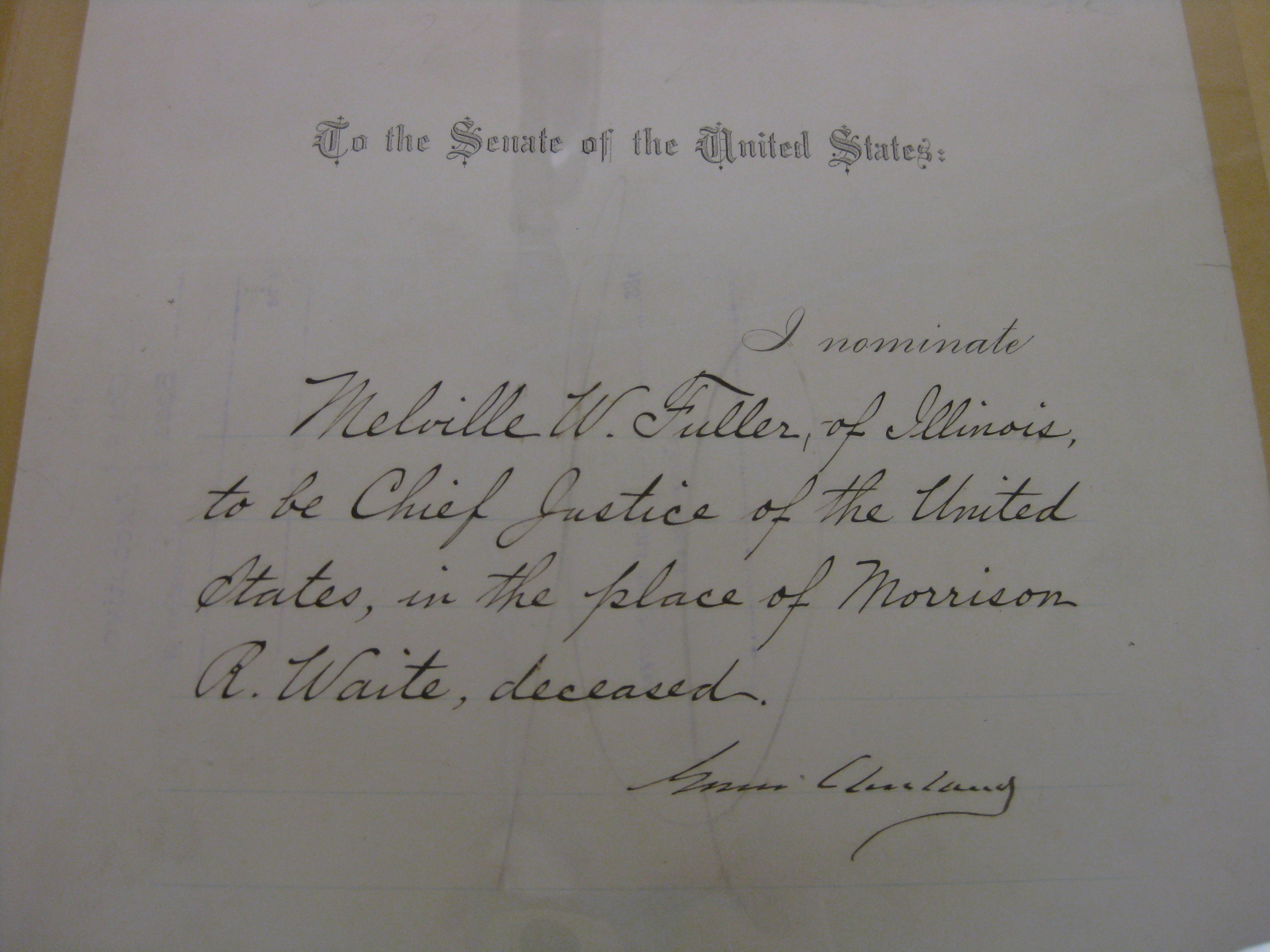
President Grover Cleveland's nomination of Melville Fuller to serve as Chief Justice (1888)

Throughout much of the nation's history, presidents also nominated individuals based upon geographical considerations. President George Washington established this practice, intentionally combining geography with his other considerations when making judicial and other appointments. Of his first six Supreme court appointments in 1789, two were from the East, two from the Mid-Atlantic and two from the South. From 1789 until 1971, with the exception of the 1865–76 Reconstruction Era, there was always a southerner on the Court; similarly, from 1789 through 1932 there was always a New Englander as well. Since the mid-1970s, however, the role of geography in the selection process has been minimal.

Beginning in the mid 20th Century, concerns about diversity on the Court with regard to religion, race, and gender have also been of particular importance to various presidents. In 1956, Dwight D. Eisenhower appointed William J. Brennan Jr., a Catholic, to the Court. Eisenhower sought a Catholic to appoint—in part because there had been no Catholic justice since 1949, and in part because Eisenhower was directly lobbied by Cardinal Francis Spellman of the Archdiocese of New York to make such an appointment. Lyndon B. Johnson, as part of his strategy to implement his civil rights agenda, appointed the first African-American justice, Thurgood Marshall, in 1967. Ronald Reagan pledged during his 1980 presidential campaign to nominate the first woman to the Supreme Court. In 1981, he nominated Sandra Day O'Connor.

An additional consideration is age; the younger the person, the longer they could conceivably serve on the Court. Presidents have generally selected persons who are in their late 40s or 50s, old enough to have the requisite experience yet young enough to impact the makeup of the court for decades.

== Confirmation ==
The Appointments Clause does not tell the Senate how to assess Supreme Court nominees. As a result, the Senate has developed, and modified over time, its own set of practices and criteria for examining nominees and their fitness to serve on the bench. Nominees are, generally speaking, examined on: character and competency; social and judicial philosophy; and party / political identification and region (of the country from).

=== Judiciary Committee ===
The Senate Judiciary Committee plays a key role in the confirmation process, as nearly every Supreme Court nomination since 1868 has come before it for review. Among the nominations since then that were not referred to the committee for review were those of: William Howard Taft, for chief Justice in 1921, and James F. Byrnes, for associate justice in 1941. Byrnes is the most recent Supreme Court nominee confirmed by the Senate without being reviewed first by a committee. Under the present procedures, the committee conducts hearings, examining the background of the nominee, and questioning him or her about their work experiences, views on a variety of constitutional issues and their general judicial philosophy. The committee also hears testimony from various outside witnesses, both supporting and opposing the nomination. Among them is the American Bar Association, which since 1952 has provided its analysis and a recommendation on each nominees' professional qualifications to sit on the Supreme Court.

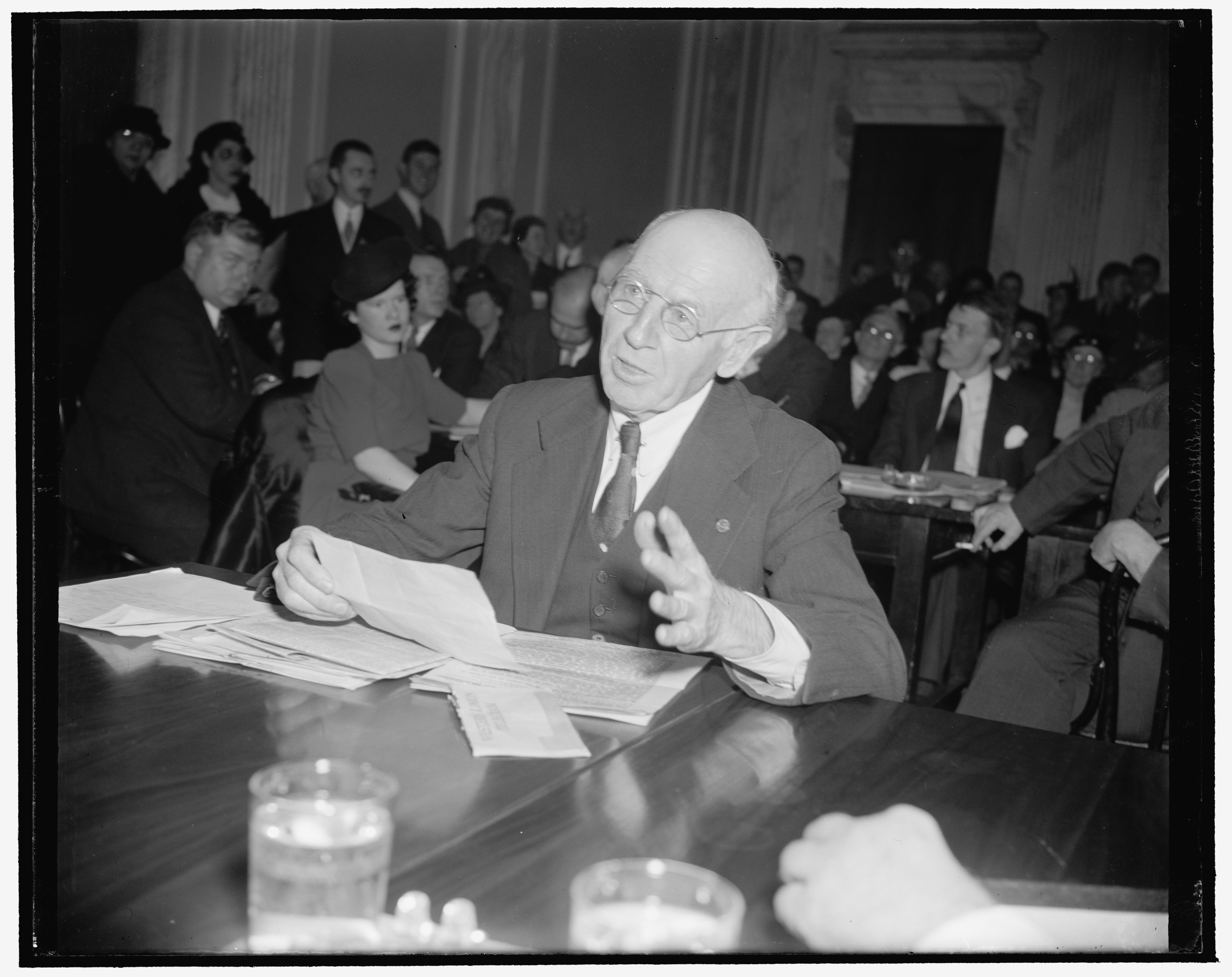
A witness giving testimony before the Senate Judiciary Committee during the 1939 hearings on the nomination of Felix Frankfurter to be an associate justice

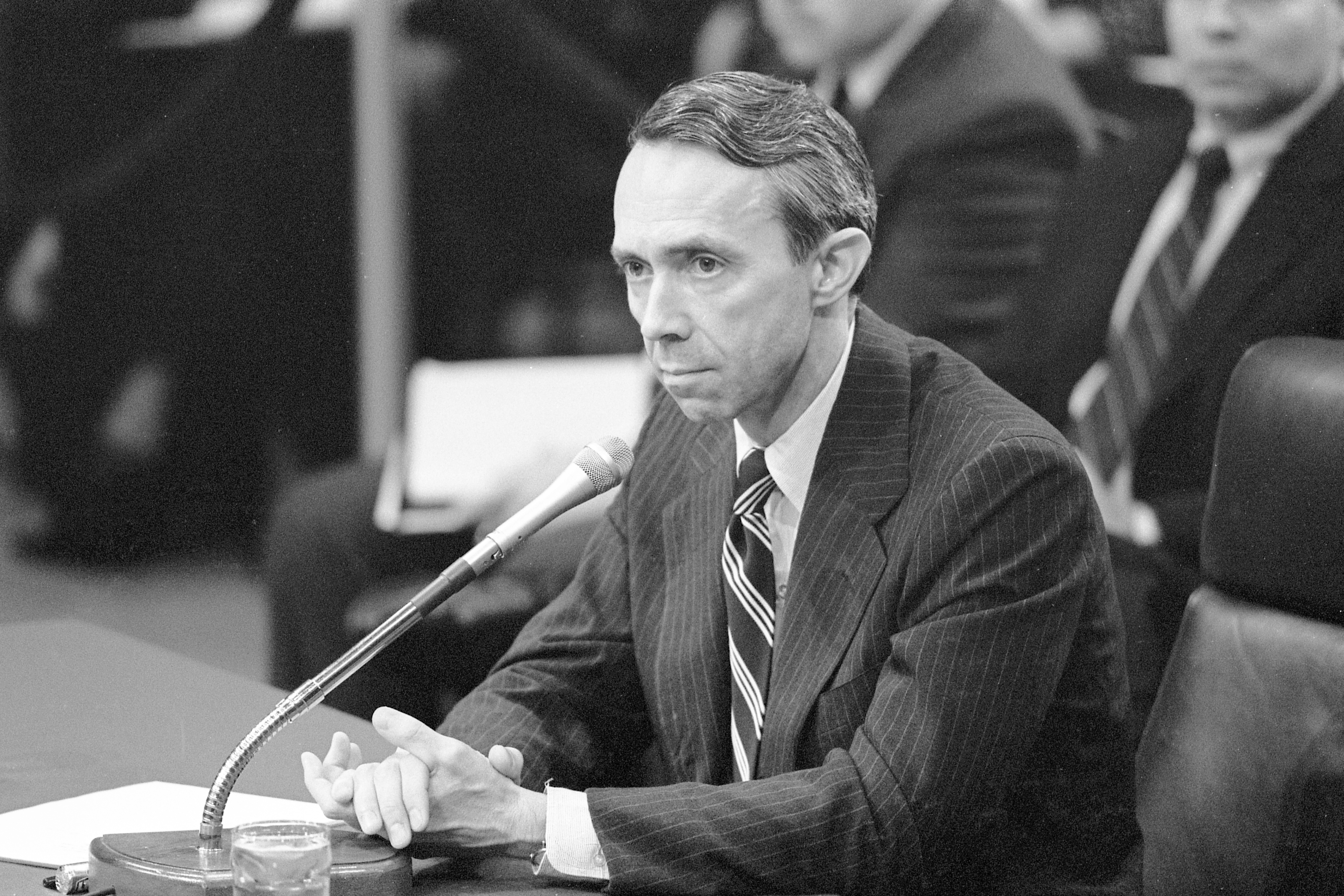
David Souter giving testimony before the Senate Judiciary Committee during the 1990 hearings on his nomination to be an associate justice

The committee's practice of personally interviewing nominees is a relatively recent development. The first recorded instance in which formal hearings are known to have been held on a Supreme Court nominee by a Senate committee were held by the Judiciary Committee in December 1873, on the nomination of George Henry Williams to become chief justice (after the committee had reported the nomination to the Senate with a favorable recommendation). Two days of closed-door hearings were held to review documents and hear testimony from witnesses about a controversy that had arisen about the nominee. Opposition to Williams intensified, and the president withdrew the nomination in January 1874. The committee did not hold hearings on another Supreme Court nominee until February 1916, when intense opposition arose against the nomination of Louis Brandeis to become an associate justice. There were 19 days of public hearings altogether; the Senate ultimately voted to confirm Brandeis in June 1916.

The first Supreme Court nominee to appear in person before the Judiciary Committee was Harlan F. Stone, at his own request, in January 1925 (after the committee had reported the nomination to the Senate with a favorable recommendation). Some western senators were concerned with his links to Wall Street and expressed their opposition when Stone was nominated. Stone proposed what was then the novelty of appearing before the Judiciary Committee to answer questions; his testimony helped secure a confirmation vote with very little opposition. The second nominee to appear before the Judiciary Committee, this time at the committee's request, was Felix Frankfurter in 1939, who only addressed what he considered to be slanderous allegations against him. The modern practice of the committee questioning nominees on their judicial views began with John Marshall Harlan II in 1955; the nomination came shortly after the Supreme Court handed down its landmark Brown v. Board of Education decision, and several southern senators threatened to block Harlan's confirmation, hence the decision to testify. Nearly all nominees since Harlan have appeared before the Judiciary Committee. Nominees during the 1950s and through the 1970s were often questioned perfunctorily; few hearings involved extended questions and comments from committee members. They were not lengthy either, as nominees typically only spent a few hours in front of the committee.

Nominations during the late civil rights and post-Watergate eras were the beginning of the style of nomination hearings where more substantive issues were discussed. This, according to Robert Katzmann, "reflects in part the increasing importance of the Supreme Court to interest groups in the making of public policy." With this transformation have come longer confirmation hearings. In 1967, for example, Thurgood Marshall spent about seven hours in front of the committee. In 1987 Robert Bork was questioned, for 30 hours over five days, with the hearings as a whole lasting for 12 days. An estimated 150–300 interest groups were involved in the Bork confirmation process.

The table below notes the approximate number of hours that media sources estimate Supreme Court nominees since 2005 (excluding those whose nomination was withdrawn) have spent before the Senate Judiciary Committee for public testimony.

Judiciary Committee votes in 2018 on whether to recommend Supreme Court nominee Brett Kavanaugh to the full Senate (Video from Voice of America)

Approximate number of hours of public testimony from Supreme Court nominees since 2005
Year	Nominee	# Hours
2005	John Roberts (CJ)	17
2006	Samuel Alito	18
2009	Sonia Sotomayor	12+
2010	Elena Kagan	17
2016	Merrick Garland (NC)	0
2017	Neil Gorsuch	20
2018	Brett Kavanaugh	32+ (Note: Kavanaugh testified for more than 32 hours during the initial September 4–7, 2018 public hearing on his nomination. He then also testified for several hours in public on September 27, 2018, on sexual-misconduct allegations made against him by Christine Blasey Ford.)
2020	Amy Coney Barrett	20
2022	Ketanji Brown Jackson	24

At the close of hearings, the committee votes on whether a nomination should go to the full Senate. Historically, it sends nominations with a favorable or unfavorable report or with no recommendation. It has been the committee's typical practice to report even those nominations that were opposed by a committee majority. The most recent nominee to be reported unfavorably was Robert Bork in 1987. In 1991, the nomination of Clarence Thomas was forwarded to the full Senate without recommendation after an earlier vote to give the nomination a favorable recommendation resulted in a tie.

Without an affirmative vote, a nomination cannot proceed to the floor of the Senate, that is unless the Senate votes to discharge it from the committee. This rarely needed parliamentary procedure was used to move the nomination in 2022 of Ketanji Brown Jackson forward, when the committee deadlocked along party lines in a vote on whether to give it a favorable recommendation.

=== Full Senate ===
Once the committee reports out the nomination, it is put before the full Senate for final consideration. A simple majority vote is required to confirm or to reject a nominee. Historically, such rejections are relatively uncommon. Of the 37 unsuccessful Supreme Court nominations since 1789, only 11 nominees have been rejected in a Senate roll-call vote. The most recent rejection of a nominee by vote of the full Senate occurred in 1987, when it defeated Robert Bork's nomination by a 42–58 vote.

Senate debate on a nomination continues until ended by cloture, which allows debate to end and forces a final vote. Historically, a three-fifths majority (60%) had to vote in favor of cloture in order to move to a final vote on a Supreme Court nominee. In 1968, there was a bi-partisan effort to filibuster the nomination of incumbent associate justice Abe Fortas as chief justice. After four days of debate, a cloture motion fell short of the necessary two-thirds majority to cut off debate. President Lyndon Johnson withdrew the nomination soon afterward. Fortas remained on the Court as an associate justice. More recently, in 2017, there was an effort to filibuster President Donald Trump's nomination of Neil Gorsuch. Unlike the Fortas filibuster, however, only Democratic senators voted against cloture. The Republican majority responded by changing the standing rules to allow for filibusters of Supreme Court nominations to be broken with simple majority rather than three-fifths. The vote threshold for cloture on nominations to lower court and executive branch positions had earlier been lowered to simple majority. That change was made in 2013, when the Democrats held the majority.

A president has the prerogative to withdraw a nomination at any point during the process, typically doing so if it becomes clear that the Senate will reject the nominee. This occurred most recently with President George W. Bush's nomination of Harriet Miers in 2005 to succeed Sandra Day O'Connor, who had announced her intention to retire. The nomination was never fully embraced by the president's own party, and Bush withdrew it before Committee hearings had begun. Bush had previously nominated John Roberts to succeed O'Connor, but upon the death of William Rehnquist, that initial nomination was withdrawn and resubmitted as a nomination for Chief Justice, for which he was confirmed. O'Connor was ultimately succeeded by Samuel Alito.

The Judiciary Committee has the prerogative to take no action on a nomination. For example, it did not act upon President Dwight Eisenhower's first nomination of John Marshall Harlan II in November 1954, as it was made one month prior to the adjournment of the 83rd Congress. Most recently, the committee, led at the time by Republicans, did not hold hearings on Democratic President Barack Obama's 2016 nomination of Merrick Garland. Citing the upcoming 2016 presidential election and Obama's Lame duck status, Senate Majority Leader Mitch McConnell declared at the time that the vacancy should be filled by the next president. The vacancy, created by the death of Antonin Scalia, arose 269 days before the election. (Note: Conversely, four years later, following the death of Ruth Bader Ginsburg 46 days prior to the 2020 presidential election, with a Republican president and Republicans in the Senate majority, the judiciary Committee held hearing and the Senate confirmed the nomination of Amy Coney Barrett.) The nomination expired in January 2017, at the end of the 114th Congress.

Similarly, the Senate has the prerogative to take no action on a nomination, or to table it, effectively eliminating any prospect of the person's confirmation. Though frequently attempted over the years, a successful vote to table a nomination has been a rare occurrence. Even so, this procedure was successfully used to block several nominees of presidents John Tyler (1841–1845) and Millard Fillmore (1850–1853). In modern time, the decision in 2016 by Senate leadership to take no action on the Garland nomination was unique, and received significant push back from scholars and in public opinion challenging whether their refusal to meaningfully consider a duly nominated and well qualified individual contravened their Appointments Clause responsibility to "advise and consent".

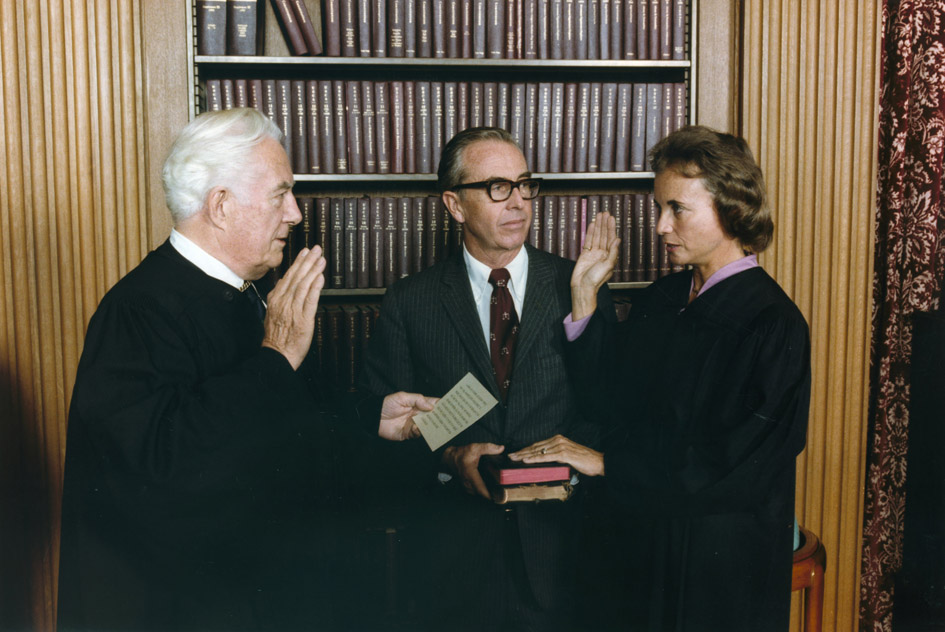
Sandra Day O'Connor is sworn in by Chief Justice Warren Burger on September 25, 1981, as her husband John O'Connor looks on.

Under Senate rules, nominations still pending when the Senate adjourns at the end of a session or recesses for more than 30 days are returned to the president unless the Senate, by unanimous consent, waives the rule. The president must submit a new nomination when the Senate returns in the new session or following its extended recess if the president still desires Senate consideration of a returned nomination. Eisenhower re-nominated John Harlan in January 1955, when the new Congress convened. Obama's successor, Donald Trump, nominated Neil Gorsuch to fill the Scalia vacancy shortly after his inauguration.

Once the Senate has taken final action on a nomination, the secretary of the Senate attests to a resolution of confirmation or rejection and sends it to the president. After receiving a resolution of confirmation, the president may then sign and deliver a commission officially appointing the nominee to the Court. The appointee then must take two oaths before executing the duties of the office: the constitutional oath, which is used for every federal and state officeholder below the president, and the judicial oath used for all federal judges. The general practice in recent decades has been to hold the oath ceremony at either the White House or the Supreme Court Building. It is at this point that a person has taken "the necessary steps toward becoming a member of the Court."

== Recess appointments ==
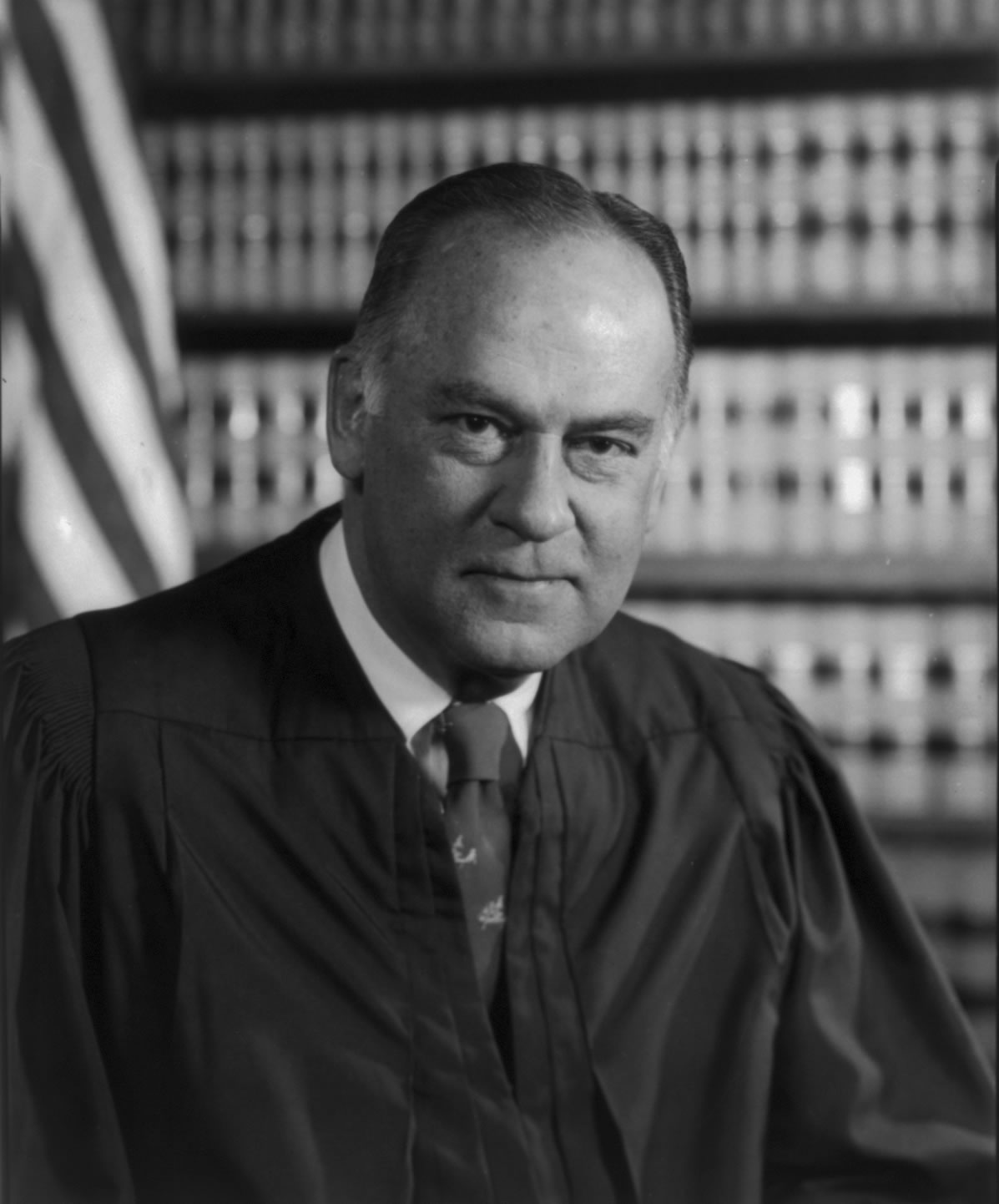
Potter Stewart, the most recent Supreme Court justice initially appointed through a recess appointment

Article II, Section 2, Clause 3 of the Constitution empowers the president to fill critical federal executive and judicial branch vacancies unilaterally but temporarily when the Senate is in recess, and thus unavailable to provide advice and consent. Such recess appointments, including to the Supreme Court, expire at the end of the next Senate session. To continue to serve thereafter, the appointee must be formally nominated by the president and confirmed by the Senate. Through the late 1800s, the Senate was in recess for long periods of time, and so this clause enabled the president to keep the functions of government running in the meantime, but without completely bypassing the system of checks and balances. As the Senate now remains in session nearly year-round, this recess appointment power has lost its original necessity and usefulness.

There have been 12 recess appointments to the Supreme Court altogether. George Washington made two: Thomas Johnson in August 1791, and John Rutledge in July 1795. Rutledge is the only recess-appointed justice not subsequently confirmed by the Senate, rejected December 1795. Later, during the 1800s, seven presidents made one recess appointment each. More recently, Dwight D. Eisenhower made three: Earl Warren in October 1953, William J. Brennan Jr. in October 1956, and Potter Stewart in October 1958. No president since has made a recess appointment to the Supreme Court. In 1960 the Senate passed a non-binding resolution stating that it was the sense of the Senate that recess appointments to the Supreme Court should not be made except under unusual circumstances.

Recess appointments made to the Supreme Court since 1791
Justice	Appointment		Nomination	
Justice	President	Date	Date	Outcome and date
Thomas Johnson	Washington	August 5, 1791	October 31, 1791	Confirmed November 7, 1791
John Rutledge^{(CJ)}	Washington	July 1, 1795	December 10, 1795	Rejected December 15, 1795
Bushrod Washington	J. Adams	September 29, 1798	December 19, 1798	Confirmed December 20, 1798
Henry Brockholst Livingston	Jefferson	November 10, 1806	December 15, 1806	Confirmed December 17, 1806
Smith Thompson	Monroe	September 1, 1823	December 5, 1823	Confirmed December 9, 1823
John McKinley	Van Buren	April 22, 1837	September 18, 1837	Confirmed September 25, 1837
Levi Woodbury	Polk	September 20, 1845	December 23, 1845	Confirmed January 3, 1846
Benjamin Robbins Curtis	Fillmore	September 22, 1851	December 11, 1851	Confirmed December 23, 1851
David Davis	Lincoln	October 17, 1862	December 1, 1862	Confirmed December 8, 1862
Earl Warren^{(CJ)}	Eisenhower	October 2, 1953	January 11, 1954	Confirmed March 1, 1954
William J. Brennan Jr.	Eisenhower	October 15, 1956	January 14, 1957	Confirmed March 19, 1957
Potter Stewart	Eisenhower	October 14, 1958	January 17, 1959	Confirmed May 5, 1959

== Partisanship and the confirmation process ==
Though Supreme Court nominations have historically been intertwined with the political battles of the day, there is a perception that the confirmation process has become more partisan over the past several decades. The 1987 battle over Robert Bork's nomination is viewed as a pivotal event in the present day politicization of the Supreme Court nomination and confirmation process. The subsequent contentious confirmation hearings for Clarence Thomas and Brett Kavanaugh, in 1991 and 2018 respectively, along with the Senate's refusal to consider the nomination of Merrick Garland in 2016, underscored the breadth of the partisan divide. Much of the proceedings around the hearings for Ketanji Brown Jackson in 2022 focused on those prior battles and which party should be blamed for politicizing the confirmation process.

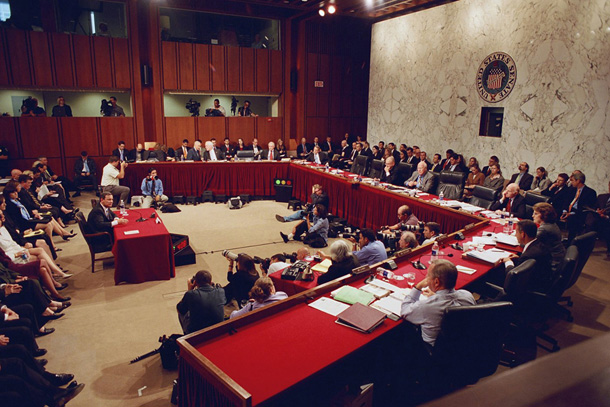
John Roberts giving testimony before the Senate Judiciary Committee during the 2005 hearings on his nomination to be chief justice

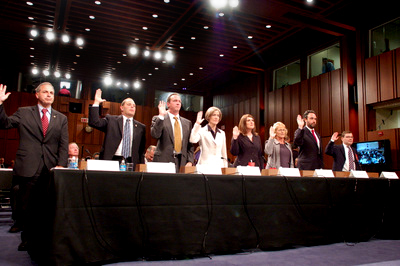
A panel of witnesses being sworn in prior to giving testimony before the Senate Judiciary Committee during the 2009 hearings on the nomination of Sonia Sotomayor to be an associate justice

The widening of the partisan divide over judicial nominations corresponds with the prolongation of the confirmation process. From the establishment of the Supreme Court up to the early 1950s, the process of approving justices was usually rapid. The average time between nomination and confirmation was 13.2 days. Eight justices during that era were confirmed on the same day they were formally nominated, including Edward Douglass White as an associate justice in 1894 and again as chief justice in 1910, and on a voice vote both times. From the mid-1950s to 2020, however, the process took much longer. Over the past 65 years, the time from nomination to confirmation has averaged 54.4 days.

Length of the confirmation process for Supreme Court justices since 1991
Year	Justice	Length from announcement	Length from nomination
1991	Clarence Thomas	106 days	99 days
1993	Ruth Bader Ginsburg	50 days	42 days
1994	Stephen Breyer	77 days	73 days
2005	John Roberts (CJ) (Note: The first Supreme Court nomination of John Roberts, as an associate justice, was withdrawn 49 day after it was announced, 39 days after it was officially submitted.)	23 days	23 days
2005	Samuel Alito	92 days	82 days
2009	Sonia Sotomayor	72 days	66 days
2010	Elena Kagan	87 days	87 days
2017	Neil Gorsuch	66 days	65 days
2018	Brett Kavanaugh	89 days	88 days
2020	Amy Coney Barrett	30 days	27 days
2022	Ketanji Brown Jackson	41 days	38 days

The partisan divide over judicial nominations can also be seen in both the referral and the confirmation vote margins received by nominees over the past few decades. Since the 1990s, the votes by which the Judiciary Committee refers nominations to the full Senate have frequently fallen along party lines. The most recent nomination forwarded with a unanimous bipartisan recommendation was that of Stephen Breyer in 1994. More recently, the 2020 nomination of Amy Coney Barrett was forwarded with a unanimous recommendation, but only because all the committee's Democrats boycotted the proceedings. Likewise, confirmation votes are increasingly falling nearly along party lines. The last justice to be confirmed by a unanimous vote was Anthony Kennedy, 97–0, in 1988; the last to receive a two-thirds majority was Sonia Sotomayor, 68–31, in 2009. The Senate voted to confirm Brett Kavanaugh in 2018 by a razor-thin 50–48–1 (51.02% favorable) margin that broke along party lines.

== Tenure and vacancies ==
=== Tenure ===
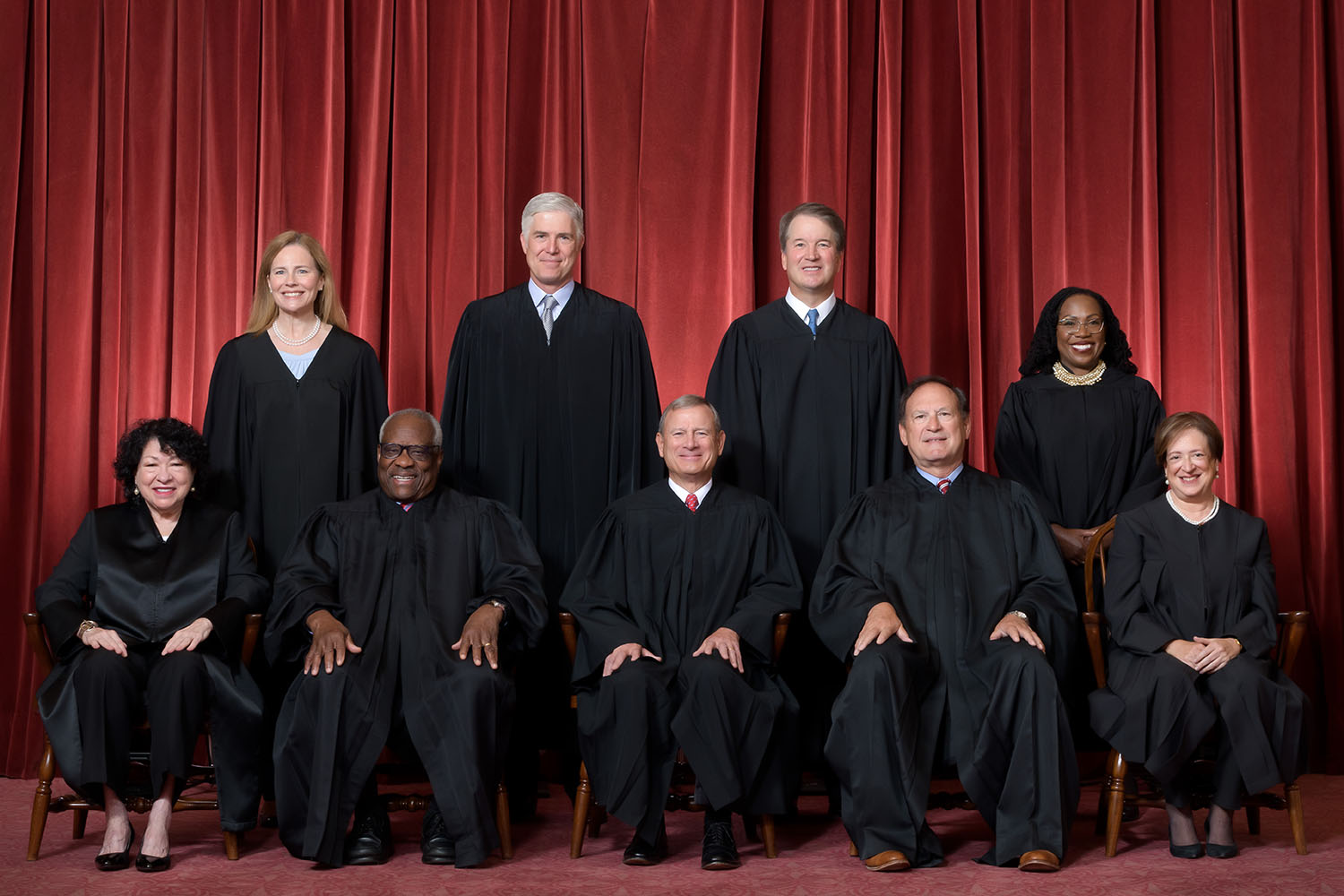
The Roberts Court (since June 2022): Front row (left to right): Sonia Sotomayor, Clarence Thomas, Chief Justice John Roberts, Samuel Alito, and Elena Kagan. Back row (left to right): Amy Coney Barrett, Neil Gorsuch, Brett Kavanaugh, and Ketanji Brown Jackson.

Article Three, Section 1 of the Constitution provides that justices "shall hold their offices during good behavior", which is understood to mean that they may serve for the remainder of their lives, until death; furthermore, the phrase is generally interpreted to mean that the only way justices can be removed from office is by Congress via the impeachment process. The Framers of the Constitution chose good behavior tenure to limit the power to remove justices and to ensure judicial independence. The only justice ever to be impeached was Samuel Chase in 1804, after he openly criticized President Thomas Jefferson and his policies to a Baltimore grand jury. The House of Representatives adopted eight articles of impeachment against Chase; however, he was acquitted by the Senate, and remained in office until his death in 1811. This failed impeachment was, according to William Rehnquist, "enormously important in securing the kind of judicial independence contemplated by" the Constitution. No subsequent effort to impeach a sitting justices has progressed beyond referral to the Judiciary Committee. William O. Douglas was the subject of hearings twice, in 1953 and again in 1970, and Abe Fortas resigned while hearings were being organized in 1969.

=== Vacancies ===
The ability of a president to appoint a new justice depends on the occurrence of a vacancy on the Court. Because justices have indefinite tenure, vacancies, and thus appointments, occur unevenly. Sometimes vacancies arise in quick succession. The shortest period of time between vacancies occurred in September 1971, when Hugo Black and John Marshall Harlan II left within days of each other. On the other hand, sometimes several years pass between vacancies. The longest period of time between vacancies was 12 years, from 1811 to 1823 (from the death of Samuel Chase to the death of Henry Brockholst Livingston). The next longest was an 11-year span, from 1994 to 2005 (from the retirement of Harry Blackmun to the death of William Rehnquist). On average a new justice joins the Court about every two years. Variables such as age, tenure, health, potential longevity and personal finances impact retirement decisions, as do considerations about whether the incumbent president—who would appoint their successor were they to retire—shares their legal-policy preferences.

Due to the randomness of vacancies, some presidents had several opportunities to make many Supreme Court appointments, while others had few or even none. George Washington made 14 nominations, 10 of which were confirmed, during his two terms in office, and Franklin D. Roosevelt appointed eight justices within a six year period during his second and third terms, while William Howard Taft made six appointments during his single term. Only William Henry Harrison, Zachary Taylor, Andrew Johnson (Note: The Judicial Circuits Act of 1866, which provided for the gradual elimination of seats on the Supreme Court until there would be seven justices, nullified a pending Supreme Court nomination and prevented Andrew Johnson from appointing a justice during the remainder of his term.) and Jimmy Carter did not have a nominee confirmed. Carter is the only one of the four who served a full term in office. (Note: Like Carter, presidents Monroe, F. Roosevelt and G. W. Bush did not have a Supreme Court nominee confirmed during their first term either, as no vacancies occurred, though each did during their second term. Others have also gone a full 4-year term without having an opportunity to appoint a Supreme Court justice.)

It was not unusual, historically, for justices to die while still on the bench. Specifically, 38 of the 57 justices (two-thirds) appointed prior to 1900 died in office. But since that time it has been less frequent for vacancies on the Court to be created by the death of a justice – about one third. The most recent justice to die while in office was Ruth Bader Ginsburg in 2020.

Since the mid-1950s, most justices (80%) have left office through (resigning into) retirement. Beginning in 1869, qualifying justices have been able to retire on a pension; currently any justice who is 65 and has served 15 years on the bench can retire with a full salary. In contrast, resignation prior to retirement eligibility is rare. The last non-retirement resignation from the Court was that of Abe Fortas in 1969.

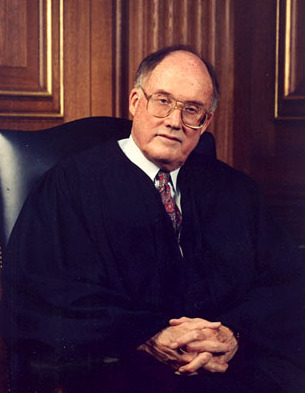
William Rehnquist, the most recent incumbent associate justice to assume the position of chief justice

When a chief justice vacancy occurs, the president may choose to nominate an incumbent associate justice for the Court's top post. If the chief justice nominee is confirmed, the chief justice must resign as an associate justice to assume the new position. The president then selects a new nominee to fill the now-vacant associate justice seat. Three persons have served as Associate Justice and then as Chief Justice without break between their periods of service: Edward Douglas White; Harlan F. Stone; and William Rehnquist.

Additionally, because the Constitution does not specify the size of the Court, Congress may determine the matter through law. If Congress were to increase the size of the Court, the president would then have an opportunity to nominate a person (or persons) to the new seat(s). Congress has increased the size of the Court on five occasions; on two other occasions it has reduced the Court's size.

Authorized number of Supreme Court justices over time
Year	Act of Congress	ANJ	Change
1789	Judiciary Act of 1789	6	—
1801	Judiciary Act of 1801	5	−1 (Note: The 1801 act called for the Court to be reduced to five justices upon its next vacancy, but was promptly repealed by an 1802 act which restored the Court's legal size to six before any such vacancy occurred.)
1802	Judiciary Act of 1802	6	+1
1807	Seventh Circuit Act of 1807	7	+1
1837	Eighth and Ninth Circuits Act of 1837	9	+2
1863	Tenth Circuit Act of 1863	10	+1
1866	Judicial Circuits Act of 1866	7	−3 (Note: The 1866 act provided that the Court's size would be thinned from ten to seven through attrition, and did result in the elimination of two seats while in effect; an 1869 act forestalled any further reduction by setting the Court's size at nine, where it remains today.)
1869	Judiciary Act of 1869	9	+2

There has been considerable variation in the duration of Supreme Court vacancies since the first occurred in 1791. (Note: The first Supreme Court vacancy resulted from the resignation of Associate Justice John Rutledge on March 5, 1791.) Vacancies on the Court generally lasted for longer periods of time prior to the 20th century. In fact, vacancies prior to 1900 lasted an average of 165 days, which is more than twice the average length of vacancies since 1900. The average duration of the 10 Supreme Court vacancies since 1991—from a justice's departure date to the swearing-in of their successor—has been 70 days. Three of these vacancies lasted for less than a day each, as the successor was sworn in the same day the retiring justice officially left office. The longest vacancy during this time frame, and the longest since the Supreme Court was expanded to nine members in 1869, was the 422-day vacancy between the death of Antonin Scalia on February 13, 2016, and the swearing-in of Neil Gorsuch on April 10, 2017. Overall, it was the eighth-longest vacancy period in U.S. Supreme Court history. The longest vacancy lasted 841 days, from the death on April 21, 1844, of Henry Baldwin until August 10, 1846, when Robert C. Grier was sworn into office to replace him.

Length of vacancies since 1991: departure date to swearing-in of successor
Justices	Length in days (dates)
T. Marshall to Thomas	22(October 1–23, 1991)
B. White to Ginsburg	43(June 28 – August 10, 1993)
Blackmun to Breyer	0(August 3, 1994)
Rehnquist to J. Roberts	26(September 3–29, 2005)
O'Connor to Alito	0(January 31, 2006)
Souter to Sotomayor	40(June 29 – August 8, 2009)
Stevens to Kagan	39(June 29 – August 7, 2010)
Scalia to Gorsuch	422(February 13, 2016 – April 10, 2017)
Kennedy to Kavanaugh	67(July 31 – October 6, 2018)
Ginsburg to Barrett	39(September 18 – October 27, 2020)
Breyer to K. Jackson	0(June 30, 2022)

== See also ==
- List of nominations to the Supreme Court of the United States
- List of positions filled by presidential appointment with Senate confirmation
- NLRB v. Noel Canning, a 2014 U.S. Supreme Court case regarding the president's recess appointment authority
