= Thomas Johnson (judge) =

US Supreme Court justice from 1791 to 1793

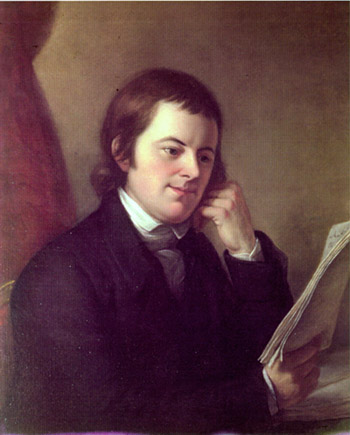
- Portrait by Charles Willson Peale

Associate Justice of the Supreme Court of the United States
- In office September 19, 1791 – January 16, 1793
- Nominated by: George Washington
- Preceded by: John Rutledge
- Succeeded by: William Paterson

1st Governor of Maryland
- In office March 21, 1777 – November 12, 1779
- Preceded by: Robert Eden (Royal)
- Succeeded by: Thomas Lee

2nd Commissioner of the Federal City
- In office January 22, 1791 – August 23, 1794
- Preceded by: Office created
- Succeeded by: Gustavus Scott

Personal details
- Born: November 4, 1732 St. Leonard, Maryland, British America
- Died: October 26, 1819 (aged 86) Frederick, Maryland, U.S.
- Resting place: Mount Olivet Cemetery, Frederick, MD
- Party: Federalist

Military service
- Allegiance: United Colonies of North America
- Branch/service: Continental Army
- Years of service: 1776–1777
- Rank: Brigadier General
- Commands: Maryland Line
- Battles/wars: American Revolutionary War

Thomas Johnson (November 4, 1732 – October 26, 1819) was an 18th-century American lawyer, politician, and patriot. He was a delegate to the First Continental Congress in 1774, where he signed the Continental Association; commander of the Maryland militia in 1776; and elected first (non-Colonial) governor of Maryland in 1777. Throughout his career, Johnson maintained a personal and political friendship with George Washington, who gave him a recess appointment as an associate justice of the Supreme Court in August 1791. Citing poor health, he served only briefly and resigned in January 1793, with the second shortest tenure of any Supreme Court justice.

== Life before the Revolution ==
Thomas Johnson was born in Calvert County, Maryland, on November 4, 1732, to Thomas Johnson (1702–1777) and his wife Dorcas Sedgwick Johnson (1705–1770). His grandfather, also named Thomas Johnson (1656–1714), was a lawyer in London who had emigrated to Maryland sometime before 1700. The younger Thomas was the fourth of ten children, some of whom later had large families of their own. (Louisa Johnson, daughter of his brother Joshua, married John Quincy Adams.)

Thomas and his siblings were educated at home. As a young man he was attracted to the law, studied it with an established firm, and was admitted to the Maryland bar in 1753. By 1760, he had moved his practice to Frederick County, and in 1761 he was elected to the Maryland provincial assembly for the first time. On February 16, 1766, Johnson married Ann Jennings, the daughter of the judge under whom he apprenticed. They had eight children, including one who died in infancy and a second who died as a young adult.

== Revolutionary years ==
In 1774 and 1775, the Maryland assembly sent him as a delegate to the Continental Congress. In the Congress Johnson was allied with those who favored separation from Great Britain. In November 1775, Congress created a Committee of [Secret] Correspondence that was to seek foreign support for the war. Thomas Johnson, along with Benjamin Franklin and Benjamin Harrison V, were initially named to the committee.

Johnson returned to Maryland and continued his work in the state's Assembly when the United States Declaration of Independence was signed. In 1775 he drafted the declaration of rights adopted by the Maryland assembly and later included as the first part of the state's first constitution. It was adopted for Maryland by the state's constitutional convention at Annapolis in 1776. He also served as a senior brigadier general in the Maryland militia from January 1776 to February 1777, commanding troops sent to aid Washington during his retreat through New Jersey in the winter. Thomas Johnson and his brothers supported the revolution by manufacturing ammunition and possibly cannon. Their former factory, Catoctin Furnace, is now part of a state park near Camp David, just north of Frederick, Maryland. In the winter of 1777, Johnson delivered supplies to the Continental Army encampment at Valley Forge.

Earlier in 1777, the state legislature elected Johnson as the new state's first Governor. He served in that capacity until 1779. In the 1780s he held a number of judicial posts in Maryland, as well as serving in the assembly in 1780, 1786, and 1787. He pushed a bill through the Maryland Assembly naming commissioners to meet with Virginia's commissioners to "…frame such liberal and equitable regulations concerning [the Potomac] river as may be mutually advantageous to the two states and that they make report thereon to the General assembly." Although Johnson was not a commissioner, the resulting conference agreed to regulate and settle the jurisdiction and navigation on their mutual border of the Potomac River. Their process served as a predecessor to the Constitutional Convention of 1787. Johnson attended the Maryland Convention in 1788, where he successfully urged the state's ratification of the United States Constitution. That year, he lost to John Eager Howard in the Maryland gubernatorial election.

== Federal years ==
In September 1789, President George Washington nominated Johnson to be the first federal judge for the District of Maryland, but he declined the appointment. In 1790 and 1791, Johnson was the senior justice in the Maryland General Court system. In January 1791, President Washington appointed Johnson, with David Stuart and Daniel Carroll, to the commission that would lay out the federal capital in accordance with the Residence Act of 1790. In September 1791 the commissioners named the federal city "The City of Washington" and the federal district "The Territory of Columbia".

On August 5, 1791, Johnson received a recess appointment from Washington as an Associate Justice of the United States Supreme Court, to the seat vacated by John Rutledge, and was sworn into office on September 19, 1791. Formally nominated to the position on October 31, 1791, his appointment was confirmed by the United States Senate on November 7, 1791. Johnson was the author of the Court's first written opinion, Georgia v. Brailsford, in 1792. He served on the court until resigning on January 16, 1793, citing his poor health.

Johnson suffered very poor health for many years, and cited it in declining Washington's 1795 offer to nominate him for Secretary of State, as Thomas Jefferson had recommended. He managed to deliver a eulogy for his friend George Washington at a birthday memorial service on February 22, 1800. On February 28, 1801, President John Adams named Johnson Chief Judge for the District of Columbia; he was confirmed for the post, but declined the appointment.

== Later years, death and legacy ==
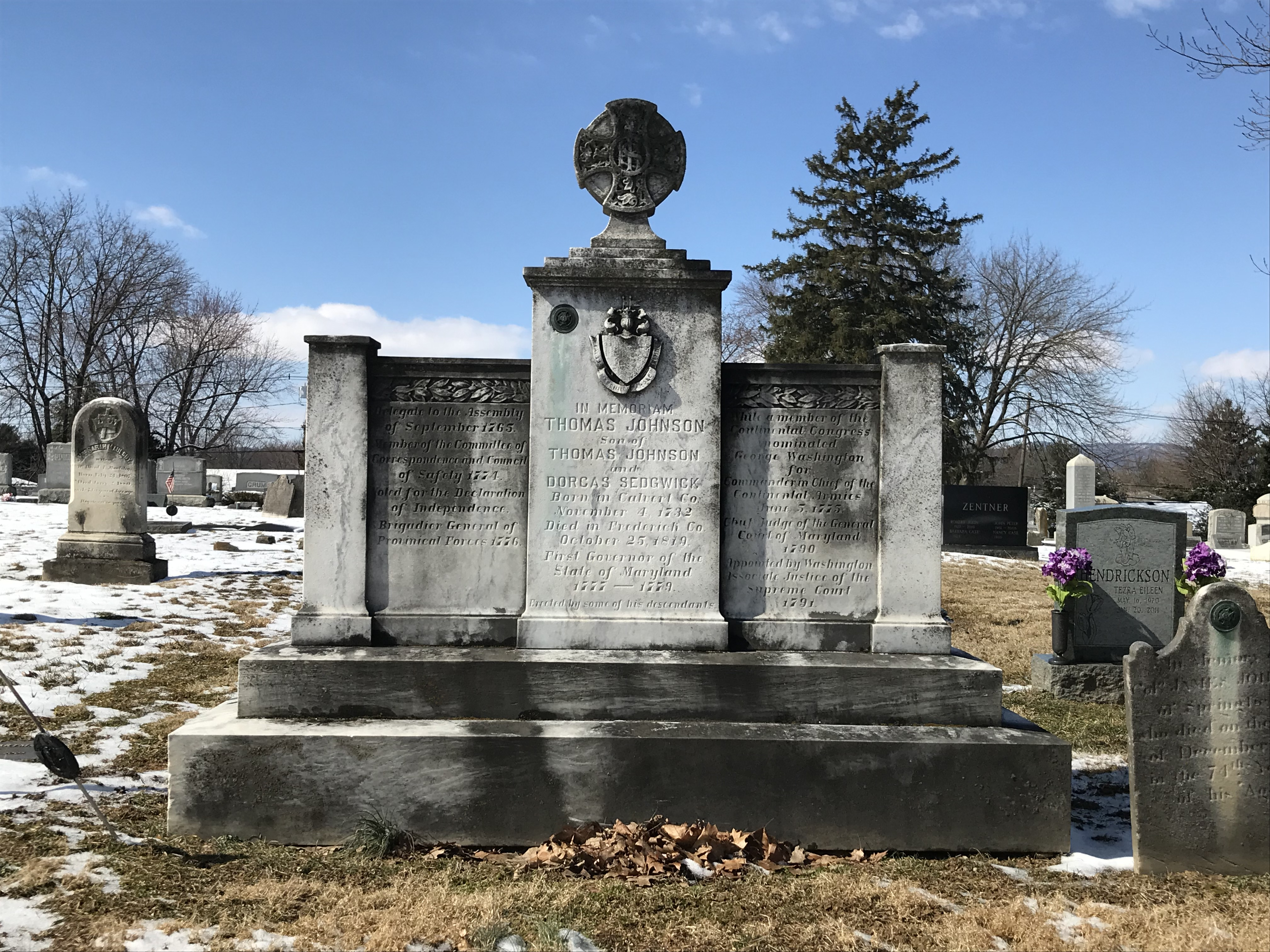
Johnson's gravesite at Mount Olivet Cemetery

His daughter Ann had married John Colin Grahame in 1788, and in his later years Johnson lived with them in a home they had built in Frederick, Maryland. The home, called Rose Hill Manor, is now a county park and open to the public. Governor Thomas Johnson High School is on half of the Rose Hill property. He died at Rose Hill on October 26, 1819, and was originally buried in All Saints churchyard. His remains were removed and re-interred at Mount Olivet Cemetery in Frederick.

Johnson was one of the first investors in the Illinois-Wabash Company, which acquired a vast swath of land in Illinois directly from several Indian tribes. Soon after his death in 1819 his son Joshua Johnson and grandson Thomas Graham sued William M'Intosh in the landmark Supreme Court case Johnson v. McIntosh. The case, which remains one of the most important property decisions in American history, determined that only the federal government could acquire Indian land, so Johnson's descendants did not have good title to the property.

Other schools named after Thomas Johnson include Governor Thomas Johnson Middle School in Frederick, Maryland, Thomas Johnson Middle School in Lanham, Maryland and Thomas Johnson Elementary School in Baltimore, Maryland. In 1978, the Governor Thomas Johnson Bridge was opened to traffic. The bridge crosses the Patuxent River and connects Calvert with St. Mary's Counties. As Johnson was a slave owner, the naming of schools for him has become controversial.

== See also ==
- Catoctin Furnace
- List of justices of the Supreme Court of the United States
- List of United States Supreme Court justices by time in office
- United States Supreme Court cases during the Jay Court

Political offices
Preceded by Robert Eden as Royal Governor of Maryland	Governor of Maryland; 1777–1779	Succeeded by Thomas Lee
Legal offices
Preceded by John Rutledge	Associate Justice of the Supreme Court of the United States; 1792–1793	Succeeded by William Paterson
