= Senate Judiciary Committee reviews of nominations to the Supreme Court of the United States =

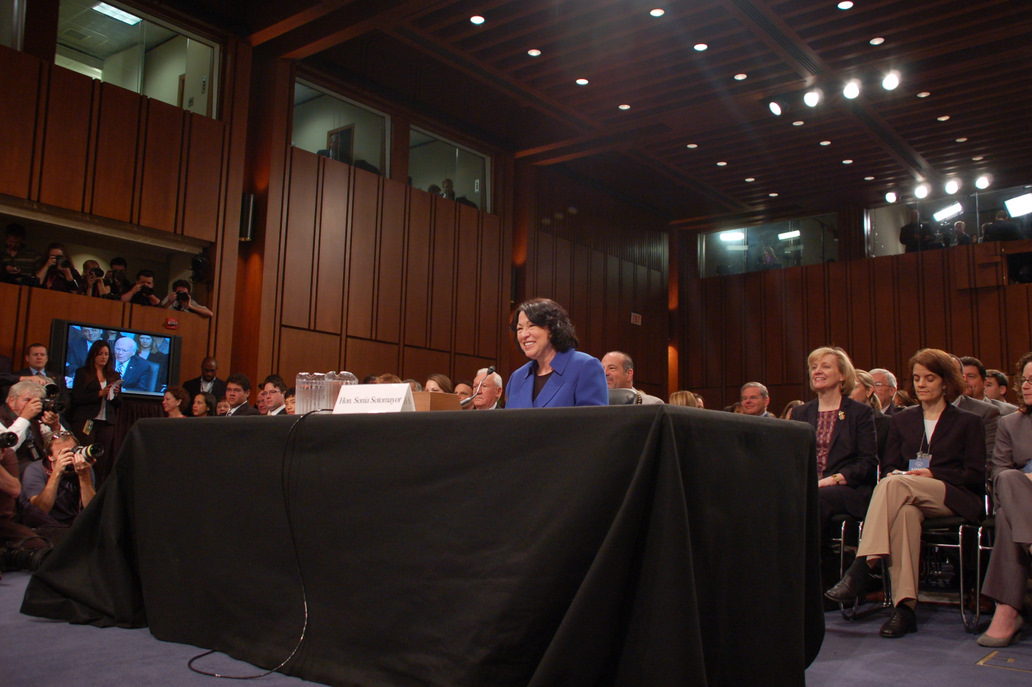
Sonia Sotomayor appearing before the Judiciary Committee on the first day of hearings on her 2009 nomination to the Supreme Court

Since the creation of the Senate Committee on the Judiciary (Judiciary Committee) in 1816, many, but not all, nominations for the Supreme Court of the United States have been first referred to a committee for review prior to facing a confirmation vote before the full United States Senate. Some nominations have been withdrawn, lapsed, or been postponed without being referred to the Judiciary Committee, while some others up until 1941 had proceeded to full Senate confirmation votes without first being reviewed by the Judiciary Committee. However, ever since 1941, all nominations have been referred to the Judiciary Committee.

In the 19th century and portions of the early 20th century, Judiciary Committee reviews were brief and entailed rather cursory looks at the nominee. However, increasingly since the 1910s, the process became more rigorous. The 1916 nomination of Louis Brandeis was the first to feature public hearings on the nomination and only the second recorded instance of any form of hearings being a part of a Judiciary Committee review of a Supreme Court nomination. From after Brandeis’ 1916 hearings until the mid-1930s, it was regarded as a courtesy to spare nominees from hearings. However, after controversy arose when it was reported shortly after Hugo Black was confirmed in 1937 without much deliberation and without any hearings that he had had association with the Ku Klux Klan, this was changed and it became more common for hearings to be held and for confirmations. The first nominee to testify at hearings on their own nomination was Harlan F. Stone in 1925, but he was the only one to do so until after the controversy surrounding Hugo Black. Since Harold Hitz Burton in 1946, no nominee has proceeded to a confirmation vote without hearings, and only four nominations that have been put forth have since failed to have hearings (all four of which lapsed or were withdrawn without confirmation votes). In more recent confirmations, hearings have often lasted around four or five days.

In more recent practice, between the announcement of the nomination and the start of hearings, the Judiciary Committee undertakes an investigative stage in which committee members and their staffs prepare for the hearings by looking over the background of the nominees and relevant issues. During this stage, nominees are typically prepped by the presidential administration for the hearings, including holding grueling mock-hearings often-dubbed “murder boards”. The nominee also often pays “courtesy call” visits to the offices of individual United States Senators. The American Bar Association's Standing Committee on the Federal Judiciary also usually provides their evaluation of the nominee's qualifications in this period before hearings are held.

Typically, at the end of its reviews of nominations, the Judiciary Committee has reported to the full Senate on the nomination. Often these reports have included either a positive or negative assessment of a nomination. The decision of how the Judiciary Committee reports has been conducted by a vote of its members. Historically, the Judiciary Committee had often published printed volumes outlining its members’ views. However, this has not occurred with any nominations in the 21st century.

== Overview of the Judiciary Committee review process ==
Since 1829, many Supreme Court nominations had been referred to the Senate's Judiciary Committee. In 1868, the Senate adopted a rule that nominations needed to be referred to appropriate standing committees, which has resulted in nearly all subsequent Supreme Court nominations being referred to the Judiciary Committee.

In modern practice, the Judiciary Committee assumes the main responsibility of investigating the qualifications and background of each nominee. Judiciary Committee reviews are not mentioned in the United States Constitution, but have become an important intermediary process between the nomination of a nominee by a president and a vote on the confirmation. The most recent nomination to face a confirmation vote without first being referred to the Judiciary Committee was the 1941 nomination of James F. Byrnes.

From the late-1960s onwards, the Judiciary Committee's review process has nearly always consisted first of the pre-hearing investigative stage, followed by public hearings, and ending with a committee decision on what recommendation the committee should make to the full Senate.

The period of time between nominations and confirmation are longer in recent decades than they once were. Before the early 1950s, the average period of time between nominations being made and votes on confirmation was 13.2 days. In contrast, for nominations spanning between the 1954 nomination of Earl Warren to the 2020 nomination of Amy Coney Barrett, the average time was 54.4 days.

=== Pre-hearing investigative stage ===
In modern practice, the period between the nomination being made and the beginning of hearings is utilized by the committee as an investigative stage. This period of time is, in modern practice, intended to be utilized by the committee members and their staffs to prepare for the hearings by looking over the background of the nominees and issues that are relevant to their nominations.

For confirmations with hearings, the amount of time that has passed between the receipt of a nomination by the Senate and the start of the first hearing has differed by nomination. The shortest time interval between these was the four days between the receipt of both the 1932 nomination of Benjamin N. Cardozo and the 1939 nomination of William O. Douglas and the beginning of hearings on those nominations. The second-shortest time interval between these occurrences was the five days between the receipt of both the 1938 nomination of Stanley F. Reed and the 1939 nomination of Felix Frankfurter and the beginning of hearings on the nominations. The longest time interval between these occurrences was the 82 days between the receipt of the 1959 nomination of Potter Stewart and the beginning of hearings on that nomination. The second-longest time interval between those occurrences was the 70 days between the receipt of the 1987 nomination of Robert Bork and the beginning of hearings on that nomination. From the 1960s onwards, the amount of time taken between the receipt of nominations and start of hearings increased over what it had tended to be prior. Prior to 1967 there was a median of only ten days between the receipt of nominations and the beginning of hearings on them. For all nominations between Thurgood Marshall's 1967 nomination and Amy Coney Barrett's 2020 nomination, the median was 27 days between the Senate's receipt of nomination and the beginning of confirmation hearings. Since the 1990s, the Judiciary Committee has typically allowed at least four weeks to elapse between the Senate's receipt of a nomination and the beginning of confirmation hearings. Of the twelve confirmations held since the 1990s, the shortest period between the receipt of the nomination and the start of hearings is the 21 days between the receipt of the 2022 nomination of Ketanji Brown Jackson and the beginning of hearings on her nomination. The second-shortest period between nomination and the start of hearings of the twelve nominations since the start of the 1990s is the 28 that elapsed between the receipt of the 1990 nomination of David Souter and the start of hearings on his nomination.

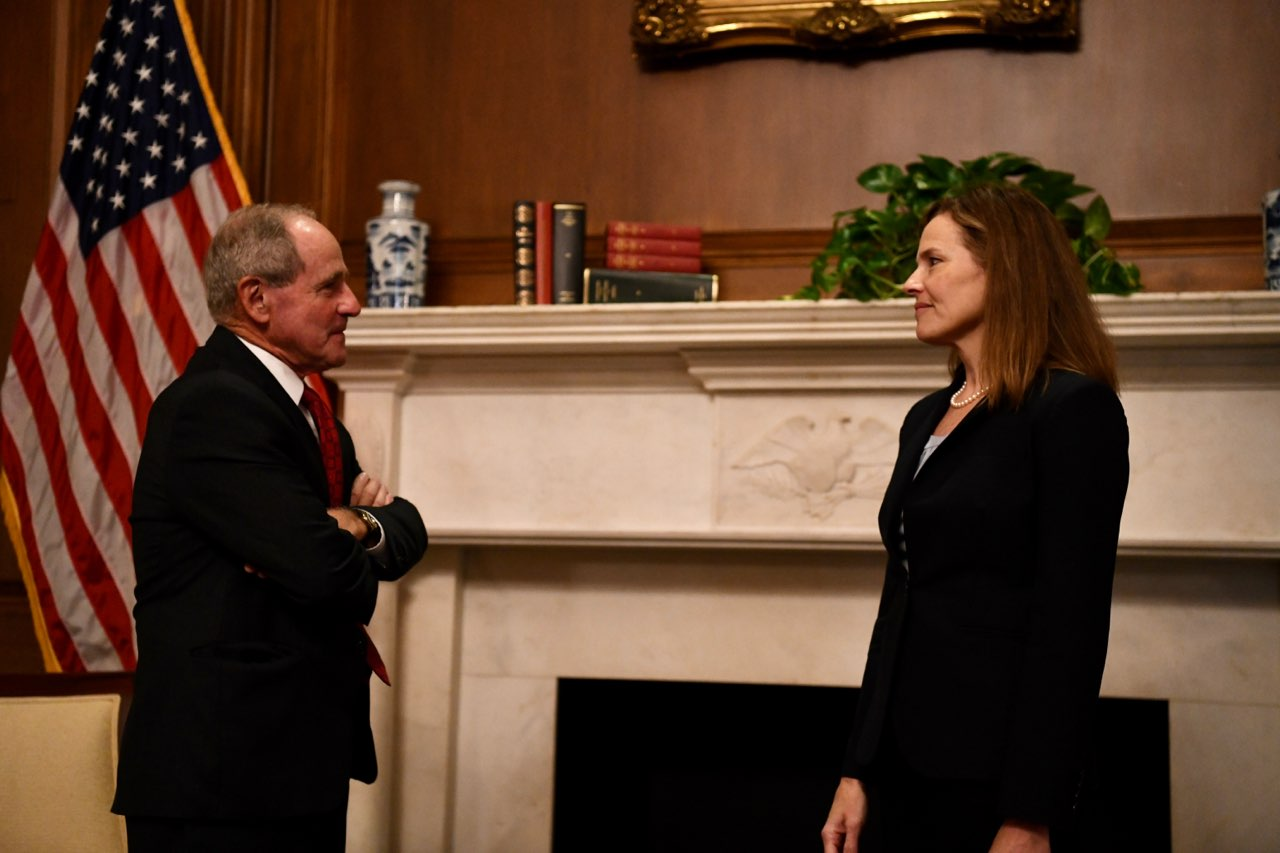
Amy Coney Barrett paying a "courtesy call" to Senator Jim Risch amid her 2020 Supreme Court nomination

It has become a long-standing tradition for nominees to, during this stage, pay "courtesy call" visits to individual senators at their offices, including those senators not on the Judiciary Committee. Also, in typical modern practice, during this pre-hearing stage, the American Bar Association's Standing Committee on the Federal Judiciary provides their evaluation of the nominee's qualifications. The American Bar Association has provided its analysis and a recommendation on the professional qualifications to sit on the Supreme Court of every nominee since 1952.

In modern practice, during this period, the presidential administration usually helps to prepare their nominee for hearings by providing them with legal background materials and by holding mock-hearings with the nominee for practice. These mock-hearings are often called "murder boards" in reference to the grueling demand they place on the nominees.

=== Hearings ===
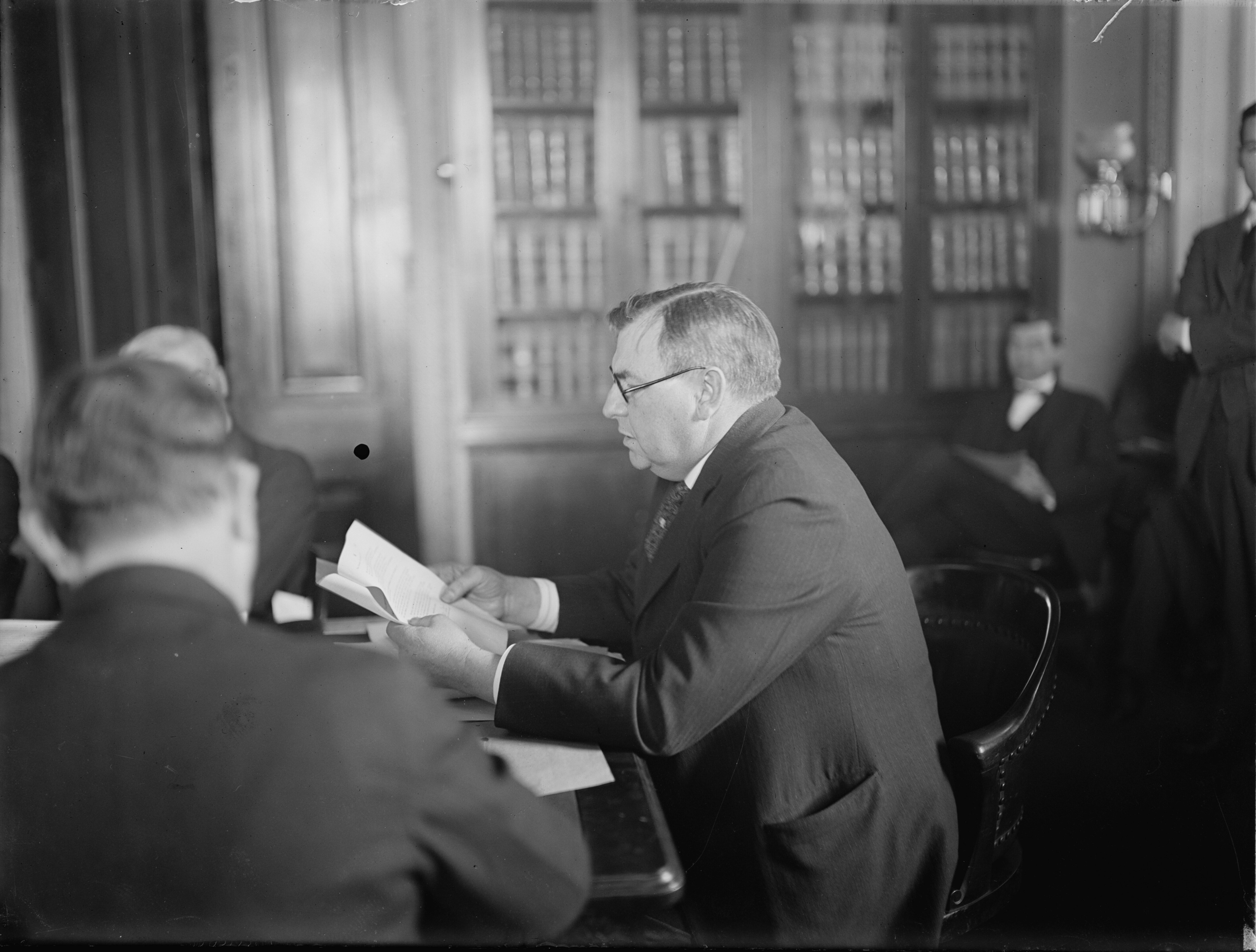
Harlan F. Stone testifying at a hearing on his nomination to the Supreme Court on January 28, 1925, the first instance in which a nominee testified at hearings on their own nomination

The first recorded instance in which formal hearings are known to have been held by the Judiciary Committee (or any other committee) in regards to a Supreme Court nomination was on December 16, 1873, when the first of two closed-door hearings was held by the committee to review documents and hear relevant testimony from witnesses about a controversy that had arisen about the nomination of George Henry Williams. This controversy, pertaining to a probe into his use of Department of Justice funds for personal household expenses, had arisen after the committee had issued its initial favorable report on his nomination (approved by the committee on December 11, 1873), but the Senate voted on December 15, 1873, to recommit the nomination (sending it back to committee). There were no more recorded instances of formal committee hearings for a Supreme Court nomination until the 1916 nomination of Louis D. Brandeis, when open door hearings were held.

While there was only one recorded instance of a Supreme Court nomination having Judiciary Committee hearings prior to 1916, Judiciary Committee hearings have since become a regular practice for Supreme Court nominations. They became increasingly prevalent between 1925 and 1946. The 1946 nomination of Harold Hitz Burton is the most recent nomination to proceed to a confirmation vote without having had formal hearings while before the Senate Judiciary Committee. Since then only four nominations put forth by presidents have gone without hearings. Two of these instances (the 2005 nominations of John Roberts and Harriet Miers to the associate judgeship being vacated by the retiring Sandra Day O'Connor) saw the nominations be withdrawn before hearings could be held. Another instance was when the 1954 nomination of John Marshall Harlan II was referred to committee only to lapse without hearings. The most recent instance was when the 2016 nomination of Merrick Garland lapsed without any Senate action.

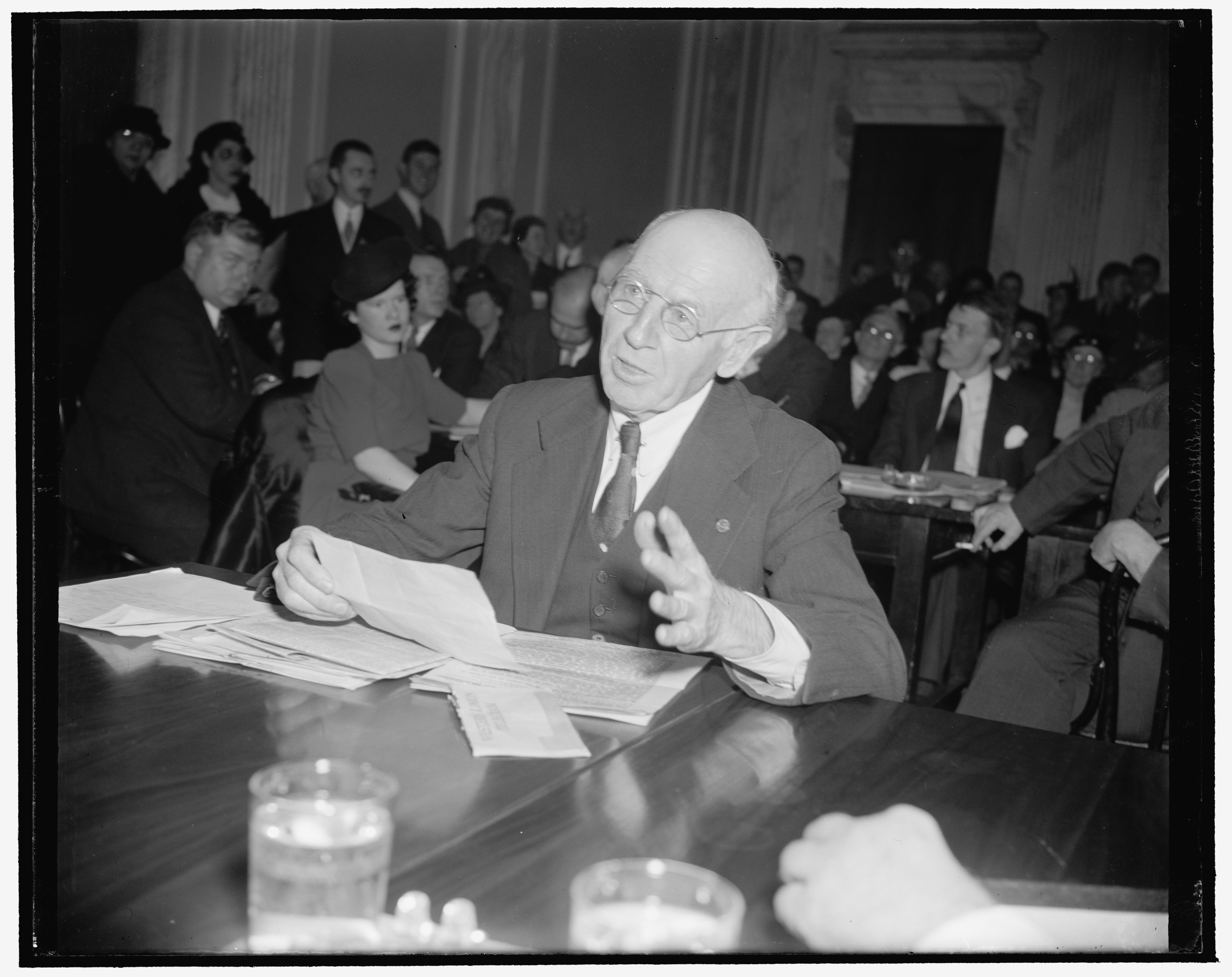
A witness giving testimony before the Senate Judiciary Committee during the 1939 hearings on the nomination of Felix Frankfurter to be an associate justice

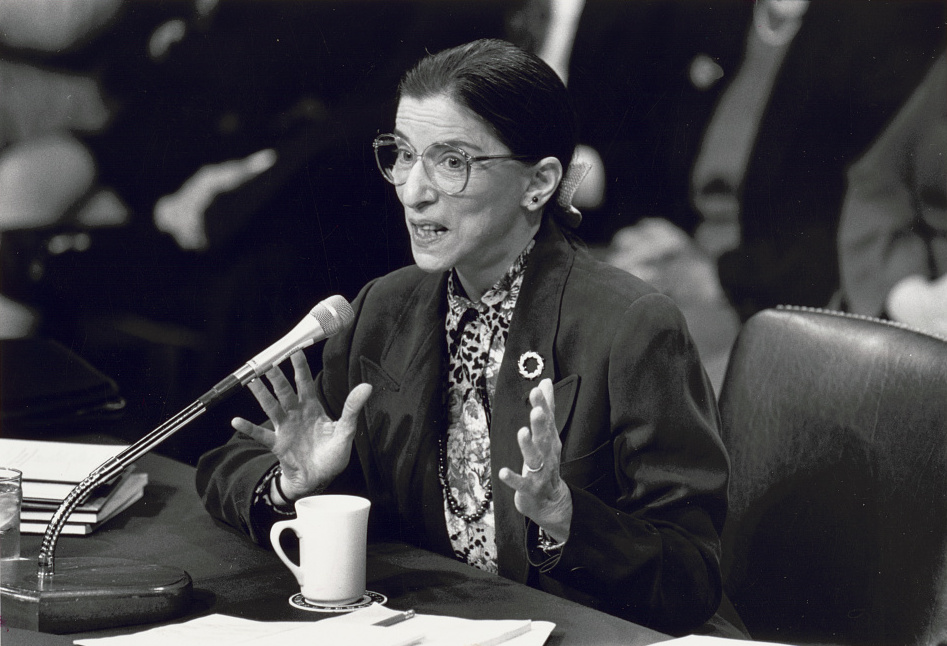
Ruth Bader Ginsburg giving testimony before the Senate Judiciary Committee during the 1993 hearings on her nomination to be an associate justice

The first nominee to appear before the committee themselves and testify at their own confirmation hearings was Harlan F. Stone in 1925. From after Brandeis' 1916 hearings until the mid-1930s, it had been seen as a courtesy to spare nominees from hearings, particularly as nominees were often already well-regarded individuals, and because hearings were seen as being tied to the appearance of scandal. Additionally, nominees did not appear to testify in-person when hearings did occur (with the exception of Harlan F. Stone). However, this began to change after the confirmation of Hugo Black in 1937. Black had been quickly confirmed after only five days of deliberation, and without any public hearings on the nomination. A month after his confirmation, the Pittsburgh Post-Gazette first reported that Black had been a member of the Ku Klux Klan. President Franklin Roosevelt, who had nominated Black, denied having known this about him. The fact that such an individual had been speedily confirmed without the diligence of having hearings brought concern that the confirmation process was flawed. Time magazine referred to this as, "the prize political scandal of the year." Not too long after, in 1939, Felix Frankfurter became the second Supreme Court nominee to testify at his own confirmation hearings, and was the first to do so at the request of the Judiciary Committee and the first to do so in open session. Frankfurter's testimony only addressed what he regarded to have been slanderous allegations raised against him.

The modern questioning of nominees on their judicial views arose with the nomination hearings for John Marshall Harlan II in 1955. His nomination followed shortly after the landmark Brown v. Board of Education decision by the Supreme Court. Several senators from the Southern United States threatened to obstruct Harlan's confirmation, which persuaded Harlan to provide his testimony at hearings. Most nominees since Harlan have appeared before the Judiciary Committee. In the 1950s, 1960s, and part of the 1970, many hearings were perfunctorily. Few hearings saw extended questioning or comments from members of the Judiciary Committee. In these decades, hearings were not lengthy either, with nominees typically only spending a few hours before the committee.

During the late civil rights and post-Watergate eras, hearings began to see more substantive issues be discussed. This, according to Robert Katzmann, "reflects in part the increasing importance of the Supreme Court to interest groups in the making of public policy." With this transformation have come longer confirmation hearings. In 1967, for example, Thurgood Marshall spent about seven hours in front of the committee. In 1987, Robert Bork was questioned for 30 hours over five days, with the hearings as a whole lasting for 12 days. An estimated 150–300 interest groups were involved in the Bork confirmation process.

Hearing for recent nominations have typically lasted four or five days. The Senate may decide to hold additional hearings if a nomination becomes controversial, an example of this being the eleven days of hearings given to the 1983 nomination of Robert Bork. The first hearings to receive gavel-to-gavel television coverage was those for the 1981 nomination of Sandra Day O'Connor.

Hearings tend to examine the background of the nominee, and directly question the nominee about their own work experiences, views on a variety of constitutional issues, and their general judicial philosophy. The hearings also tend to include testimony from various outside witnesses both in support and opposition to a nomination. Among them is the American Bar Association.

The table below notes the approximate number of hours that media sources estimate Supreme Court nominees since 2005 (excluding those whose nomination was withdrawn) have spent before the Senate Judiciary Committee for public testimony:

Approximate number of hours of public testimony from Supreme Court nominees since 2005
Year	Nominee	# Hours
2005	John Roberts (CJ)	17
2006	Samuel Alito	18
2009	Sonia Sotomayor	12+
2010	Elena Kagan	17
2016	Merrick Garland (NC)	0
2017	Neil Gorsuch	20
2018	Brett Kavanaugh	32+ (Note: Kavanaugh testified for more than 32 hours during the initial September 4–7, 2018 public hearing on his nomination. He then also testified for several hours in public on September 27, 2018, on sexual-misconduct allegations made against him by Christine Blasey Ford.)
2020	Amy Coney Barrett	20
2022	Ketanji Brown Jackson	24

=== Reports ===
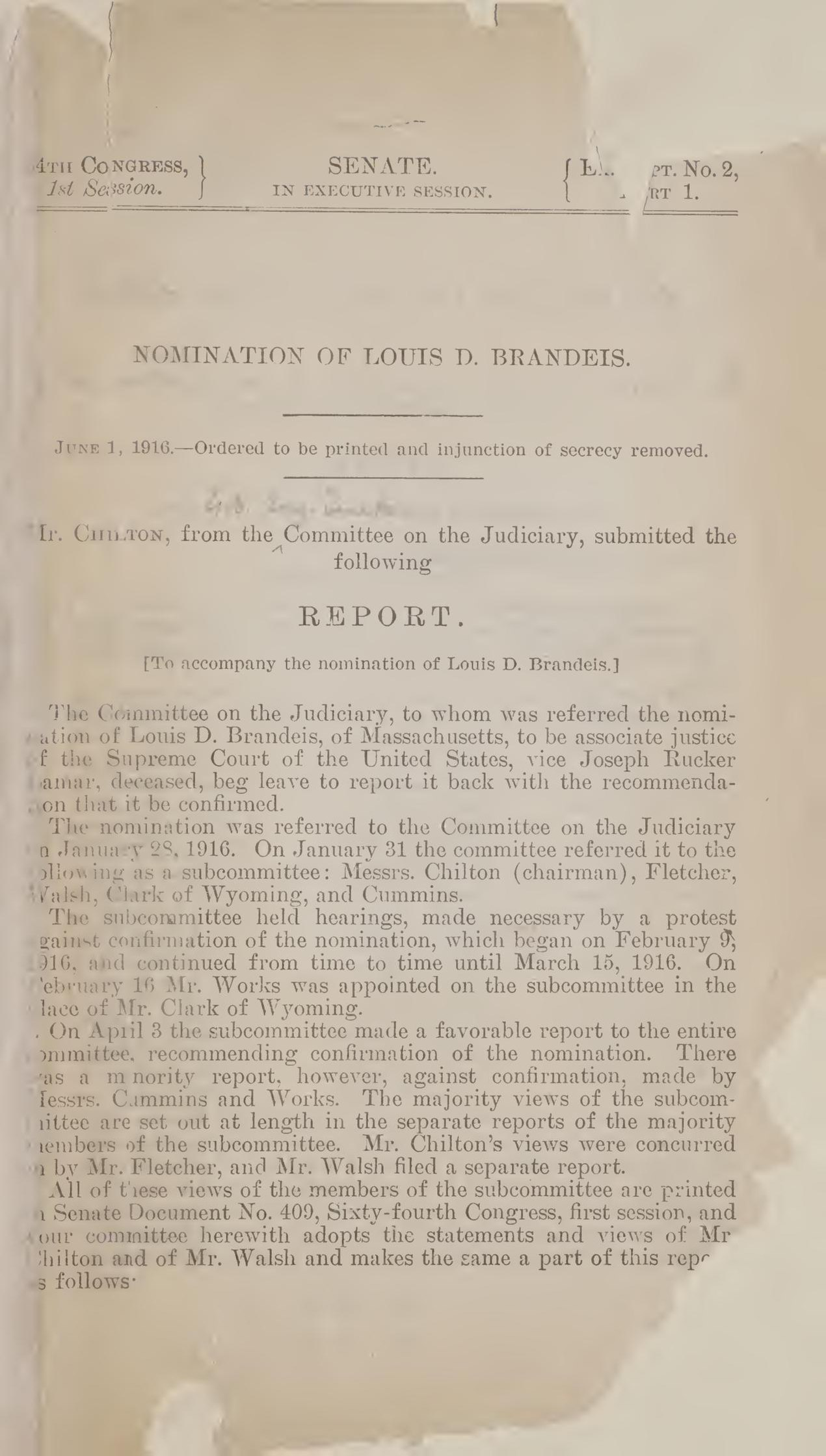
First page of the printed report of the Judiciary Committee on the 1916 nomination of Louis Brandeis

The Judiciary Committee generally gives a report to the Senate in modern practice. Typically, the committee meets in open session within a week of the end of hearings in order to determine what their report will be. Typical practice is to report even on nominations the majority of the committee opposes, in order to allow for the full Senate to make a final decision on whether to confirm or not. Without an affirmative vote, a nomination cannot proceed to the floor of the Senate unless the Senate votes to discharge it from the committee. The rarely needed parliamentary procedure of discharging a nomination from committee was used to move the 2022 nomination of Ketanji Brown Jackson forward after the Judiciary Committee deadlocked along party lines in a vote on whether to give it a favorable recommendation.

While early reports typically did not include an assessment or recommendation, it had since become common practice for reports to. The 1991 nomination of Clarence Thomas was the most recent instance in which the Judiciary Committee voted to report without a recommendation (which it did only after an earlier committee vote on whether to report positively on his nomination had failed to pass). The most recent instance where no recommendation was given, however, was the 2022 confirmation of Ketanji Brown Jackson, with the aforementioned move by the Senate to vote without a Judiciary Committee recommendation after the committee deadlocked. However, unlike with Thomas' nomination, the move to advance from committee review to full-Senate consideration of the confirmation without a recommendation was not made by a vote of the Judiciary Committee, but rather by a vote of the full Senate.

Seven nominations have received negative committee report (either an “unfavorable” recommendation, an “adverse” report, or a report featuring a “recommendation not to act”). The only two instances in which the Senate has confirmed a nominee that had received a negative committee report were the nominations of Stanley Matthews in 1881 and Lucius Quintus Cincinnatus Lamar in 1888. The most recent instance in which the committee gave a nomination a negative report was the 1987 nomination of Robert Bork, whose nomination was rejected by the Senate.

Only six nominations that have received favorable committee reports have failed to result in a confirmation.

While, previously, the Senate Judiciary Committee regularly provided printed committee reports, from the 2005 nomination of John Roberts onwards, nominations have gone without one. Printed reports were prepared behind closed doors after the committee had held their vote and provided a single volume outlining the views of committee members on the nomination as well as supplemental minority or additional views.

=== Judiciary Committee chairs ===
The Judiciary Committee is led by a chair.

Two Judiciary Committee chairs (Martin Van Buren and Joe Biden) would subsequently serve as president of the United States. Both put forward nominations to the Supreme Court during their presidencies. However, of the two, only Biden had any nominations referred to the Judiciary Committee during his tenure as its chair.

One Judiciary Committee chair, John J. Crittenden, was subsequently nominated to the Supreme Court. Crittenden was not confirmed, however, as his nomination lapsed after a recommendation from the Judiciary Committee that the Senate not act on the nomination. During Crittenden's tenure as Judiciary Committee chair, no nominations were recorded as having been formally reviewed by the committee. In fact, his own subsequent nomination is the first recorded instance of the committee receiving a nomination for review.

Below is a table listing chairs of the Senate Judiciary Committee, with the number of nominations that were referred to the committee during their tenure(s) as chair:

Chairs of the Senate Judiciary Committee
Name	Party	Tenure	Total number of nominations referred to Judiciary Committee during tenure	Cumulative total for all tenures
Dudley Chase	Democratic-Republican	1816–1817	0	0
John J. Crittenden	Democratic-Republican	1817–1818	0	0
James Burrill Jr.	Federalist	1818–1819	0	0
William Smith	Democratic-Republican	1819–1823	0	0
Martin Van Buren	Democratic-Republican	1823–1828	0	0
John M. Berrien (first tenure)	Jacksonian	1829–1831	0	7
John Rowan	Democratic-Republican	1829–1831	1	1
William L. Marcy	Jacksonian	1831–1832	0	0
William Wilkins	Jacksonian	1832–1833	0	0
John M. Clayton	Anti-Jacksonian	1833–1836	1	1
Felix Grundy	Jacksonian	1836–1838	5	5
Garret D. Wall	Democratic	1838–1841	0	0
John M. Berrien (second tenure)	Whig	1841–1845	7	7
Chester Ashley	Democratic	1845–1847	3	3
Andrew Butler	Democratic	1847–1857	4	4
James A. Bayard Jr.	Democratic	1857–1861	1	1
Lyman Trumbull	Republican	1861–1872	8	8
George G. Wright	Republican	1872	0	0
George F. Edmunds (first tenure)	Republican	1872–1879	4	12
Allen G. Thurman	Democratic	1879–1881	2	2
George F. Edmunds (second tenure)	Republican	1881–1891	8	12
George Frisbie Hoar (first tenure)	Republican	1891–1893	2	6
James L. Pugh	Democratic	1893–1895	3	3
George Frisbie Hoar (second tenure)	Republican	1895–1904	4	6
Orville H. Platt	Republican	1904–1905	0	0
Clarence D. Clark	Republican	1905–1912	6	6
Charles Allen Culberson	Democratic	1912–1919	3	3
Knute Nelson	Republican	1919–1923	3	3
Frank B. Brandegee	Republican	1923–1924	0	0
Albert B. Cummins	Republican	1924–1926	1	1
George W. Norris	Republican	1926–1933	4	4
Henry F. Ashurst	Democratic	1933–1941	5	5
Frederick Van Nuys	Democratic	1941–1945	3	3
Pat McCarran (first tenure)	Democratic	1945–1947	2	4
Alexander Wiley	Republican	1947–1949	0	0
Pat McCarran (second tenure)	Democratic	1949–1953	2	4
William Langer	Republican	1953–1955	3	3
Harley M. Kilgore	Democratic	1955–1956	1	1
James Eastland	Democratic	1956–1978	16	16
Ted Kennedy	Democratic	1978–1981	0	0
Strom Thurmond	Republican	1981–1987	3	3
Joe Biden	Democratic	1987–1995	6	6
Orrin Hatch (first tenure)	Republican	1995–2001	0	0
Patrick Leahy (first tenure)	Democratic	2001	0	2
Orrin Hatch (second tenure)	Republican	2001	0	0
Patrick Leahy (second tenure)	Democratic	2001–2003	0	2
Orrin Hatch (third tenure)	Republican	2003–2005	0	0
Arlen Specter	Republican	2005–2007	4	4
Patrick Leahy (third tenure)	Democratic	2007–2015	2	2
Chuck Grassley (first tenure)	Republican	2015–2019	3	3
Lindsey Graham	Republican	2019–2021	1	1
Dick Durbin	Democratic	2021–2025	1	1
Chuck Grassley (second tenure)	Republican	2025–present	0	3
General sources:

== Actions on nominations by other committees prior to the creation of the Senate Judiciary Committee ==
Nominee	Nominated by		Senate majority party	Committee action					Subsequent action/ outcome
Nominee	President	Party	Senate majority party	Committee	Committee chair	Public hearing date(s)	Final vote date	Final vote	Subsequent action/ outcome
Alexander Wolcott	Madison	Dem-Rep	Dem-Rep	Select committee		No record of hearing	February 13, 1811	Reported	Rejected by Senate (9–24) on February 13, 1811
General source:

== List of Judiciary Committee actions ==
The following is a list of Senate Judiciary Committee actions on nominations for the Supreme Court of the United States. Excluded from this list are nominations for which there either was no committee referral or for which no record exists of any committee referral.

Nominee	Nominated by		Senate majority party	Committee action				Subsequent action/ outcome
Nominee	President	Party	Senate majority party	Committee chair	Public hearing date(s)	Final vote date	Final vote	Subsequent action/ outcome
John J. Crittenden	J. Q. Adams	Rep (A-C)	Rep (J-C)	John Rowan	No record of hearing	January 26, 1829	Reported with recommendation not to act	Postponed by Senate (23–17) (Note: Senate voted to postpone taking action on this nomination, effectively eliminating any prospect of confirmation.) on February 12, 1829
James Moore Wayne	Jackson	Democratic	Natl Rep	John M. Clayton	No record of hearing	January 9, 1835	Reported	Confirmed by voice vote on January 9, 1835
Roger B. Taney (second nomination)	Jackson	Democratic	Democratic	Felix Grundy	No record of hearing	January 5, 1836	Reported	Confirmed (29–15) on March 15, 1836
Philip P. Barbour	Jackson	Democratic	Democratic	Felix Grundy	No record of hearing	January 5, 1836	Reported	Confirmed (30–11) on March 15, 1836
John Catron	Jackson	Democratic	Democratic	Felix Grundy	No record of hearing	March 8, 1937	Reported	Confirmed (23–18) on March 8, 1937
William Smith	Jackson	Democratic	Democratic	Felix Grundy	No record of hearing	March 8, 1937	Reported	Confirmed (28–15) on March 8, 1937
John McKinley (Note: Nominee was serving on the Court under a recess appointment when the nomination was made.)	Van Buren	Democratic	Democratic	Felix Grundy	No record of hearing	September 25, 1937	Reported	Confirmed by voice vote on September 25, 1837
John C. Spencer	Tyler	None	Whig	John M. Berrien	No record of hearing	January 30, 1844	Reported	Rejected by Senate (21–26) on January 31, 1844
Reuben Walworth	Tyler	None	Whig	John M. Berrien	No record of hearing	June 14, 1844	Reported	Tabled (postponed) by Senate on June 15, 1844 (27–20); nomination withdrawn on June 17, 1844
Edward King	Tyler	None	Whig	John M. Berrien	No record of hearing	June 14, 1844	Reported	Tabled (postponed) by Senate on June 15, 1844 (29–18)
Reuben Walworth	Tyler	None	Whig	John M. Berrien	No record of hearing	January 21, 1845	Reported	Tabled (postponed) by Senate on January 21, 1845; nomination withdrawn on February 6, 1845
Edward King	Tyler	None	Whig	John M. Berrien	No record of hearing	January 21, 1845	Reported	Tabled (postponed) by Senate on January 21, 1845; nomination withdrawn on February 8, 1845
Samuel Nelson	Tyler	None	Whig	John M. Berrien	No record of hearing	February 8, 1845	Reported	Confirmed by voice vote on February 14, 1845
John M. Read	Tyler	None	Whig	John M. Berrien	No record of hearing	February 14, 1845	Reported	Lapsed
Levi Woodbury	Polk	Democratic	Democratic	Chester Ashley	No record of hearing	January 3, 1846	Reported	Confirmed by voice vote on January 3, 1846
George Woodward	Polk	Democratic	Democratic	Chester Ashley	No record of hearing	January 20, 1846	Reported	Rejected by Senate (20–29) on January 22, 1846
Robert Cooper Grier	Polk	Democratic	Democratic	Chester Ashley	No record of hearing	August 4, 1846	Reported	Confirmed by voice vote on August 4, 1846
Benjamin R. Curtis	Fillmore	Whig	Democratic	Andrew Butler	No record of hearing	December 23, 1851	Reported	Confirmed by voice vote on December 23, 1851
Edward A. Bradford	Fillmore	Whig	Democratic	Andrew Butler	No record of hearing	August 30, 1852	Reported	Tabled by Senate; lapsed
William C. Micou	Fillmore	Whig	Democratic	Andrew Butler	No record of hearing	N/A	On February 24, 1853 (the same day the Senate referred the nomination to committee), the Senate ordered the committee to discharge the nomination	Lapsed
John A. Campbell	Pierce	Democratic	Democratic	Andrew Butler	No record of hearing	March 22, 1853	Reported	Confirmed by voice vote on March 22, 1853
Nathan Clifford	Buchanan	Democratic	Democratic	James A. Bayard Jr.	No record of hearing	December 9, 1857	Reported	Confirmed (26–23) on January 12, 1858
Noah Haynes Swayne	Lincoln	Republican	Republican	Lyman Trumbull	No record of hearing	February 6, 1861	Reported	Confirmed (38–1) on January 24, 1862
David Davis	Lincoln	Republican	Republican	Lyman Trumbull	No record of hearing	December 5, 1862	Reported	Confirmed by voice vote on December 8, 1862
Stephen Johnson Field	Lincoln	Republican	Republican	Lyman Trumbull	No record of hearing	March 9, 1863	Reported	Confirmed by voice vote on March 10, 1863
Henry Stanbery	A. Johnson	Natl Union	Republican	Lyman Trumbull	No record of hearing	N/A	Referred to Judiciary Committee on April 16, 1866, but no record exists of any committee vote	Lapsed (Note: On July 23, 1866, Andrew Johnson signed the Judicial Circuits Act into law. The Act, which provided for the gradual elimination of several seats on the Supreme Court, effectively voided Stanbery's nomination, and ultimately denied Johnson the opportunity of placing any justices on the Supreme Court.)
Ebenezer R. Hoar	Grant	Republican	Republican	Lyman Trumbull	No record of hearing	December 22, 1869	Reported adversely	Rejected by Senate (24–33) on February 3, 1870
William Strong	Grant	Republican	Republican	Lyman Trumbull	No record of hearing	February 14, 1870	Reported favorably	Confirmed by voice vote on February 18, 1870
Joseph P. Bradley	Grant	Republican	Republican	Lyman Trumbull	No record of hearing	February 14, 1870	Reported favorably	Confirmed (46–9) on March 21, 1870
Ward Hunt	Grant	Republican	Republican	Lyman Trumbull	No record of hearing	December 11, 1872	Reported favorably	Confirmed by voice vote on December 11, 1872
George Henry Williams	Grant	Republican	Republican	George F. Edmunds	No record of hearing	December 11, 1873	Reported favorably	Recommitted (returned to the committee) on December 15, 1873; nomination withdrawn on January 8, 1874
George Henry Williams	Grant	Republican	Republican	George F. Edmunds	Closed hearings on Dec 16 and 17, 1873	N/A		Recommitted (returned to the committee) on December 15, 1873; nomination withdrawn on January 8, 1874
Caleb Cushing	Grant	Republican	Republican	George F. Edmunds	No record of hearing	January 9, 1874	Reported favorably	Nomination withdrawn on January 13, 1874
Morrison Waite	Grant	Republican	Republican	George F. Edmunds	No record of hearing	January 20, 1874	Reported favorably	Confirmed (63–0) on January 21, 1874
John Marshall Harlan	Hayes	Republican	Republican	George F. Edmunds	No record of hearing	November 26, 1877	Reported favorably	Confirmed by voice vote on November 29, 1877
William Burnham Woods	Hayes	Republican	Democratic	Allen G. Thurman	No record of hearing	December 20, 1880	Reported favorably	Confirmed (39–8) on December 21, 1880
Stanley Matthews	Hayes	Republican	Democratic	Allen G. Thurman	No record of hearing	February 7, 1881	Considered	Lapsed
Stanley Matthews	Hayes	Republican	Democratic	Allen G. Thurman	No record of hearing	February 14, 1881	Postponed	Lapsed
Stanley Matthews	Garfield	Republican	Republican	George F. Edmunds	No record of hearing	May 9, 1881	Reported adversely (6–1)	Confirmed (24–23) on May 12, 1881
Horace Gray	Arthur	Republican	Split	George F. Edmunds	No record of hearing	December 20, 1881	Reported favorably	Confirmed (51–5) on December 20, 1881
Roscoe Conkling	Arthur	Republican	Split	George F. Edmunds	No record of hearing	March 2, 1882	Reported favorably	Confirmed (Note: Declined to serve.) (39–12) on March 2, 1882
Samuel Blatchford	Arthur	Republican	Split	George F. Edmunds	No record of hearing	March 22, 1882	Reported favorably	Confirmed by voice vote on March 22, 1882
Lucius Q. C. Lamar II	Cleveland	Democratic	Republican	George F. Edmunds	No record of hearing	January 10, 1888	Reported adversely (5–4)	Confirmed (32–28) on January 16, 1888
Melville Fuller	Cleveland	Democratic	Republican	George F. Edmunds	No record of hearing	July 2, 1888	Reported without recommendation	Confirmed (41–20) on July 20, 1888
David Josiah Brewer	B. Harrison	Republican	Republican	George F. Edmunds	No record of hearing	December 16, 1889	Reported favorably	Confirmed (53–11) on December 18, 1889
Henry Billings Brown	B. Harrison	Republican	Republican	George F. Edmunds	No record of hearing	December 29, 1890	Reported favorably	Confirmed by voice vote on December 29, 1890
George Shiras Jr.	B. Harrison	Republican	Republican	George Frisbie Hoar	No record of hearing	July 25, 1892	Reported favorably	Confirmed by voice vote on July 26, 1892
Howell E. Jackson	B. Harrison	Republican	Republican	George Frisbie Hoar	No record of hearing	February 13, 1893	Reported favorably	Confirmed by voice vote on February 18, 1893
William B. Hornblower	Cleveland	Democratic	Democratic	James L. Pugh	No record of hearing	September 25, 1893; October 25, 1893; October 30, 1893	Considered	Lapsed
William B. Hornblower	Cleveland	Democratic	Democratic	James L. Pugh	No record of hearing	December 11, 1893; December 14, 1893; December 18, 1893	Considered	Rejected (24–30) on January 15, 1894
William B. Hornblower	Cleveland	Democratic	Democratic	James L. Pugh	No record of hearing	January 8, 1894	Reported adversely	Rejected (24–30) on January 15, 1894
Wheeler H. Peckham	Cleveland	Democratic	Democratic	James L. Pugh	No record of hearing	February 12, 1894	Committee divided (5–5) in vote on question of reporting favorability; ultimately reported without recommendation	Rejected (32–41) on February 16, 1894
Rufus W. Peckham	Cleveland	Democratic	Republican	George Frisbie Hoar	No record of hearing	December 9, 1895	Reported favorably	Confirmed by voice vote on December 9, 1895
Joseph McKenna	McKinley	Republican	Republican	George Frisbie Hoar	No record of hearing	January 13, 1898	Reported favorably	Confirmed by voice vote on January 21, 1898
Oliver W. Holmes Jr.	T. Roosevelt	Republican	Republican	George Frisbie Hoar	No record of hearing	December 4, 1902	Reported favorably	Confirmed by voice vote on December 4, 1902
William R. Day	T. Roosevelt	Republican	Republican	George Frisbie Hoar	No record of hearing	February 19, 1903	Reported favorably	Confirmed by voice vote on February 23, 1903
William Henry Moody	T. Roosevelt	Republican	Republican	Clarence D. Clark	No record of hearing	December 10, 1906	Reported favorably	Confirmed by voice vote on December 12, 1906
Horace Harmon Lurton	Taft	Republican	Republican	Clarence D. Clark	No record of hearing	December 16, 1909	Reported favorably	Confirmed by voice vote on December 20, 1909
Charles Evans Hughes	Taft	Republican	Republican	Clarence D. Clark	No record of hearing	February 5, 1910	Reported favorably	Confirmed by voice vote on May 2, 1910
Willis Van Devanter	Taft	Republican	Republican	Clarence D. Clark	No record of hearing	December 15, 1910	Reported favorably	Confirmed by voice vote on December 15, 1910
Joseph Rucker Lamar	Taft	Republican	Republican	Clarence D. Clark	No record of hearing	December 15, 1910	Reported favorably	Confirmed by voice vote on December 15, 1910
Mahlon Pitney	Taft	Republican	Republican	Clarence D. Clark	No record of hearing	March 4, 1912	Reported favorably	Confirmed (50–26) on March 13, 1912
James C. McReynolds	Wilson	Democratic	Democratic	Charles Allen Culberson	No record of hearing	August 19, 1914	Reported favorably	Confirmed (44–6) on August 29, 1914
Louis Brandeis	Wilson	Democratic	Democratic	Charles Allen Culberson	Feb. 9–10, 1916; Feb. 15–18, 1916; Feb. 24–26, 1916; Feb. 29 – March 4, 1916; March 6–8, 1916; March 14–15, 1916	May 24, 1916	Reported favorably (10–8)	Confirmed (47–22) on June 1, 1916
John Hessin Clarke	Wilson	Democratic	Democratic	Charles Allen Culberson	No record of hearing	July 24, 1916	Reported favorably	Confirmed by voice vote on July 24, 1916
Pierce Butler	Harding	Republican	Republican	Knute Nelson	No record of hearing	November 28, 1922	Reported favorably	Lapsed
Pierce Butler	Harding	Republican	Republican	Knute Nelson	Closed hearings held on Dec 12 and 13, 1922	December 18, 1922	Reported favorably	Motion to recommit defeated (7–63) on December 21, 1922; confirmed (61–8) on December 21, 1922
Edward Terry Sanford	Harding	Republican	Republican	Knute Nelson	No record of hearing	January 28, 1923	Reported favorably	Confirmed by voice vote on January 29, 1923
Harlan F. Stone	Coolidge	Republican	Republican	Albert B. Cummins	Closed hearing held on January 12, 1925	January 21, 1925	Reported favorably	Recommitted (returned to committee) on January 26, 1925; confirmed (71–6) on February 5, 1925
Harlan F. Stone	Coolidge	Republican	Republican	Albert B. Cummins	Closed hearing held on January 28, 1925	February 2, 1925	Reported favorably	Recommitted (returned to committee) on January 26, 1925; confirmed (71–6) on February 5, 1925
Charles Evans Hughes	Hoover	Republican	Republican	George W. Norris	No record of hearing	February 10, 1930	Reported favorably (10–2)	Motion to recommit defeated (3–49) on February 13, 1930; confirmed (52–26) on February 13, 1930
John J. Parker	Hoover	Republican	Republican	George W. Norris	April 5, 1930	April 21, 1930	Reported adversely	Rejected (39–41) on May 7, 1930
Owen Roberts	Hoover	Republican	Republican	George W. Norris	No record of hearing	May 19, 1930	Reported favorably	Confirmed by voice vote on May 20, 1930
Benjamin N. Cardozo	Hoover	Republican	Republican	George W. Norris	February 19, 1932	February 23, 1932	Reported favorably	Confirmed by voice vote on February 24, 1932
Hugo Black	F. D. Roosevelt	Democratic	Democratic	Henry F. Ashurst	No record of hearing	August 16, 1937	Reported favorably (13–4)	Confirmed (63–16) on August 17, 1937
Stanley Forman Reed	F. D. Roosevelt	Democratic	Democratic	Henry F. Ashurst	January 20, 1938	January 24, 1938	Reported favorably	Confirmed by voice vote on January 25, 1938
Felix Frankfurter	F. D. Roosevelt	Democratic	Democratic	Henry F. Ashurst	Jan. 10–12, 1939	January 16, 1939	Reported favorably	Confirmed by voice vote on January 17, 1939
William O. Douglas	F. D. Roosevelt	Democratic	Democratic	Henry F. Ashurst	March 24, 1939	March 27, 1939	Reported favorably	Confirmed (62–4) on April 4, 1939
Frank Murphy	F. D. Roosevelt	Democratic	Democratic	Henry F. Ashurst	January 11, 1940	January 15, 1940	Reported favorably	Confirmed by voice vote on January 16, 1940
Harlan F. Stone (Note: Incumbent associate justice nominated for chief justice. Such appointments are subject to a separate confirmation process.)	F. D. Roosevelt	Democratic	Democratic	Frederick Van Nuys	June 21, 1941	June 23, 1941	Reported favorably	Confirmed by voice vote on June 27, 1941
Robert H. Jackson	F. D. Roosevelt	Democratic	Democratic	Frederick Van Nuys	June 21, 1941; June 23, 1941; June 27, 1941; June 30, 1941	June 23, 1941	Reported favorably	Confirmed by voice vote on July 7, 1941
Wiley Rutledge	F. D. Roosevelt	Democratic	Democratic	Frederick Van Nuys	January 22, 1943	February 1, 1943	Reported favorably	Confirmed by voice vote on February 8, 1943
Harold Hitz Burton	Truman	Democratic	Democratic	Pat McCarran	No record of hearing	September 19, 1945	Reported favorably	Confirmed by voice vote on September 19, 1945
Fred M. Vinson	Truman	Democratic	Democratic	Pat McCarran	June 14, 1946	June 19, 1946	Reported favorably	Confirmed by voice vote on June 20, 1946
Tom C. Clark	Truman	Democratic	Democratic	Pat McCarran	Aug. 9–11, 1949	August 12, 1949	Reported favorably	Confirmed (73–8) on August 18, 1949
Sherman Minton	Truman	Democratic	Democratic	Pat McCarran	September 27, 1949	October 3, 1943	Reported favorably (9–2)	Motion to recommit defeated on October 4, 1949; confirmed (48–16) on October 4, 1949
Earl Warren	Eisenhower	Republican	Republican	William Langer	February 2, 1954; February 19, 1954	February 24, 1954	Reported favorably (12–3)	Confirmed by voice vote on March 1, 1954
John Marshall Harlan II	Eisenhower	Republican	Republican	William Langer	No hearing held	N/A	Referred to Judiciary Committee on September 9, 1945, but no record exists of any committee vote	Lapsed
John Marshall Harlan II	Eisenhower	Republican	Democratic	Harley M. Kilgore	February 25, 1955	March 10, 1955	Reported favorably (10–4)	Confirmed (71–11) on March 16, 1955
William J. Brennan Jr.	Eisenhower	Republican	Democratic	James O. Eastland	Feb 26 and 27, 1957	March 4, 1957	Reported favorably	Confirmed by voice vote on March 19, 1957
Charles Evans Whittaker	Eisenhower	Republican	Democratic	James O. Eastland	March 18, 1957	March 19, 1957	Reported favorably	Confirmed by voice vote on March 19, 1957
Potter Stewart	Eisenhower	Republican	Democratic	James O. Eastland	Apr 9 and 14, 1959	May 5, 1959	Reported favorably (12–3)	Confirmed (70–17) on May 5, 1959
Byron White	Kennedy	Democratic	Democratic	James O. Eastland	April 11, 1962	April 11, 1962	Reported favorably	Confirmed by unanimous consent on April 11, 1962
Arthur Goldberg	Kennedy	Democratic	Democratic	James O. Eastland	Sep 11 and 13, 1962	September 25, 1962	Reported favorably	Confirmed by unanimous consent on September 25, 1962
Abe Fortas	L. Johnson	Democratic	Democratic	James O. Eastland	August 5, 1965	August 10, 1965	Reported favorably	Confirmed by unanimous consent on August 11, 1965
Thurgood Marshall	L. Johnson	Democratic	Democratic	James O. Eastland	July 13, 14, 18, 19 and 24, 1967	August 3, 1967	Reported favorably (11–5)	Confirmed (69–11) on August 30, 1967
Abe Fortas	L. Johnson	Democratic	Democratic	James O. Eastland	Jul 11 and 12, 1968; Jul. 16–20, 1968; Jul 22 and 23, 1968; September 13, 1968; September 16, 1968	September 17, 1968	Reported favorably (11–6)	Cloture motion rejected (45–43) on October 1, 1968; nomination withdrawn (Note: Nominee continued to serve as an associate justice.) on October 2, 1968
Homer Thornberry	L. Johnson	Democratic	Democratic	James O. Eastland	Jul 11 and 12, 1968; Jul. 16–20, 1968; Jul 22 and 23, 1968; September 13, 1968; September 16, 1968	N/A	No committee vote taken	Nomination withdrawn on October 2, 1968
Warren E. Burger	Nixon	Republican	Democratic	James O. Eastland	June 3, 1969	June 3, 1969	Reported favorably	Confirmed (74–3) on June 9, 1969
Clement Haynsworth	Nixon	Republican	Democratic	James O. Eastland	Sep. 16–19, 1969; Sep. 23–26, 1969	October 9, 1969	Reported favorably (10–7)	Rejected (45–55) on November 21, 1969
G. Harrold Carswell	Nixon	Republican	Democratic	James O. Eastland	Jan. 7–9, 1970; Feb 2 and 3, 1970	February 16, 1970	Reported favorably (13–4)	Rejected (45–51) on April 8, 1970
Harry Blackmun	Nixon	Republican	Democratic	James O. Eastland	April 29, 1970	May 6, 1970	Reported favorably (17–0)	Confirmed (94–0) on May 12, 1970
Lewis F. Powell Jr.	Nixon	Republican	Democratic	James O. Eastland	Nov 3 and 4, 1971; Nov. 8–10, 1971	November 23, 1971	Reported favorably (17–0)	Confirmed (89–1) on December 6, 1971
William Rehnquist	Nixon	Republican	Democratic	James O. Eastland	Nov 3 and 4, 1971; Nov. 8–10, 1971	November 23, 1971	Reported favorably (12–4)	Confirmed (68–26) on December 10, 1971
John Paul Stevens	Ford	Republican	Democratic	James O. Eastland	Dec. 8–10, 1975	December 11, 1975	Reported favorably (13–0)	Confirmed (98–0) on December 17, 1975
Sandra Day O'Connor	Reagan	Republican	Republican	Strom Thurmond	Sep. 9–11, 1981	September 15, 1981	Reported favorably (17–1)	Confirmed (99–0) on September 21, 1981
William Rehnquist	Reagan	Republican	Republican	Strom Thurmond	Jul. 29 – August 1, 1986	August 14, 1986	Reported favorably (13–5)	Confirmed (65–33) on September 17, 1986
Antonin Scalia	Reagan	Republican	Republican	Strom Thurmond	Aug 5 and 6, 1986	August 14, 1986	Reported favorably (18–0)	Confirmed (98–0) on September 17, 1986
Robert Bork	Reagan	Republican	Democratic	Joe Biden	Sep. 15–19, 1987; Sep. 21–23, 1987; September 25, 1987; Sep. 29–30, 1987	October 6, 1987	Motion to report favorably rejected (5–9); reported unfavorably (9–5)	Rejected (42–58) on October 23, 1987
Anthony Kennedy	Reagan	Republican	Democratic	Joe Biden	Dec. 14–16, 1987	January 27, 1988	Reported favorably (14–0)	Confirmed (97–0) on February 3, 1988
David Souter	G. H. W. Bush	Republican	Democratic	Joe Biden	Sep 13 and 14, 1990; Sep. 17–19, 1990	September 27, 1990	Reported favorably (13–1)	Confirmed (90–9) on October 2, 1990
Clarence Thomas	G. H. W. Bush	Republican	Democratic	Joe Biden	Sep. 10–13, 1991; Sep. 16–17, 1991; Sep 19 and 20, 1991; Oct. 11–13, 1991	September 27, 1991	Motion to report favorably failed (7–7); reported without recommendation (13–1)	Confirmed (52–48) on October 15, 1991
Ruth Bader Ginsburg	Clinton	Democratic	Democratic	Joe Biden	Jul, 20–23, 1993	July 29, 1993	Reported favorably (18–0)	Confirmed (96–3) on August 3, 1993
Stephen Breyer	Clinton	Democratic	Democratic	Joe Biden	Jul. 12–15, 1994	July 19, 1994	Reported favorably (18–0)	Confirmed (87–9) on July 29, 1994
John Roberts	G. W. Bush	Republican	Republican	Arlen Specter	No hearing held	N/A	Nomination referred to Judiciary Committee on July 29, 2005. No committee vote taken.	Nomination withdrawn on September 6, 2005
John Roberts	G. W. Bush	Republican	Republican	Arlen Specter	Sep. 12–15, 2005	September 22, 2005	Reported favorably (13–5)	Confirmed (78–22) on September 29, 2005
Harriet Miers	G. W. Bush	Republican	Republican	Arlen Specter	No hearing held	N/A	Nomination referred to Judiciary Committee on October 7, 2005. No committee vote taken.	Nomination withdrawn on October 28, 2005
Samuel Alito	G. W. Bush	Republican	Republican	Arlen Specter	Jan. 9–13, 2006	January 24, 2006	Reported favorably (10–8)	Confirmed (58–42) on January 31, 2006
Sonia Sotomayor	Obama	Democratic	Democratic	Patrick Leahy	Jul. 13–16, 2009	July 28, 2009	Reported favorably (13–6)	Confirmed (68–31) on August 6, 2009
Elena Kagan	Obama	Democratic	Democratic	Patrick Leahy	Jun. 28 – Jul 1, 2010	July 20, 2010	Reported favorably (13–6)	Confirmed (63–37) on August 5, 2010
Merrick Garland	Obama	Democratic	Republican	Chuck Grassley	No hearing held	N/A	Nomination referred to Judiciary Committee on March 16, 2016. No committee vote taken.	Lapsed
Neil Gorsuch	Trump	Republican	Republican	Chuck Grassley	Mar. 20–23, 2017	April 3, 2017	Reported favorably (11–9)	Confirmed (54–45) on April 7, 2017
Brett Kavanaugh	Trump	Republican	Republican	Chuck Grassley	Sep. 4–7, 2018; September 27, 2018	September 28, 2018	Reported favorably (11–9)	Confirmed (50–48) on October 6, 2018
Amy Coney Barrett	Trump	Republican	Republican	Lindsey Graham	Oct. 12–15, 2020	October 22, 2020	Reported favorably (12–0) (Note: Democratic members of committee boycotted the committee's hearings and vote)	Confirmed (52–48) on October 26, 2020
Ketanji Brown Jackson	Biden	Democratic	Democratic	Dick Durbin	March 21–24, 2022	April 3, 2022	Motion to report favorably deadlocked (11–11), thus failing. Senate subsequently voted 53–47 on April 4, 2022, to discharge the nomination from committee	Confirmed 53–47 on April 7, 2022
General sources:				Dick Durbin				

== Motions to refer nominations to the Judiciary Committee ==
Several times the Senate has held votes on whether to have the Judiciary Committee review a nomination.

=== Motions to recommit ===
Several votes have been held on whether to return a nomination to committee for further review.

Nominee	Nominated by		Recommitting vote														Cite
Nominee	President	Party of President	Date of vote	Outcome	"Yea" votes		"Nay" votes		Majority party	Vote by party							Cite
Nominee	President	Party of President	Date of vote	Outcome	Total	%	Total	%	Majority party	Democratic		Republican		Other Parties			Cite
Nominee	President	Party of President	Date of vote	Outcome	Total	%	Total	%	Majority party	Total "yaes"	Total "nays"	Total "yaes"	Total "nays"	Party name	Total "yaes"	Total "nays"	Cite
Nominee	George Henry Williams	Grant	Republican	December 15, 1873	Recommitted	Voice vote				Republican	—N/a	—N/a	—N/a	—N/a	—N/a	—N/a	—N/a
Pierce Butler	Harding	December 21, 1922	Republican	Motion defeated	7	10.00%	63	90.00%		Republican				—	—	—	
Harlan F. Stone	Coolidge	January 26, 1925	Republican	Recommitted	Voice vote				—N/a	Republican	—N/a	—N/a	—N/a	—N/a	—N/a	—N/a	
Charles Evans Hughes	Hoover	February 13, 1930	Republican	Motion defeated	31	38.75%	49	61.25%	19	Republican	11	12	38	Farmer-Labor	0	0	
Hugo Black	F. D. Roosevelt	Democratic	August 17, 1937	Motion defeated	15	18.52%	66	81.48%	Democratic	6	59	9	5	Farmer-Labor	0	1	
Hugo Black	F. D. Roosevelt	Democratic	August 17, 1937	Motion defeated	15	18.52%	66	81.48%	Democratic	6	59	9	5	Wisconsin Progressive	0	1	
Hugo Black	F. D. Roosevelt	Democratic	August 17, 1937	Motion defeated	15	18.52%	66	81.48%	Democratic	6	59	9	5	Independents	0	0	
Sherman Minton	Truman	Democratic	October 4, 1949	Motion defeated	21	27.63%	45	59.21%	Democratic	2	36	19	9	—	—	—	
General source:

=== Other motions ===
The 1826 nomination of Robert Trimble by John Quincy Adams saw a successful effort to first refer the nomination to the Judiciary Committee, with the Senate voting to reject the motion to do so. The Senate defeated a motion to refer this nomination to the Judiciary Committee by a 7–25 vote on May 9, 1826. The Senate confirmed the nomination later that day.

== Nominations that were not referred to the Judiciary Committee ==
The following outlines United States Supreme Court nominations that were not referred to the Judiciary Committee

=== Nominations predating the creation of the Judiciary Committee ===
List of nominations predating the creation of the Judiciary Committee
Nominee	Nominated by		Senate majority party	Outcome
Nominee	President	Party	Senate majority party	Outcome
John Jay	Washington	None	Pro Admin	Confirmed by voice vote on September 26, 1789
John Rutledge	Washington	None	Pro Admin	Confirmed by voice vote September 26, 1789
William Cushing	Washington	None	Pro Admin	Confirmed by voice vote on September 26, 1789
James Wilson	Washington	None	Pro Admin	Confirmed by voice vote on September 26, 1789
John Blair Jr.	Washington	None	Pro Admin	Confirmed by voice vote on September 26, 1789
Robert H. Harrison	Washington	None	Pro Admin	Confirmed by voice vote on September 26, 1789
James Iredell	Washington	None	Pro Admin	Confirmed by voice vote on February 10, 1790
Thomas Johnson	Washington	None	Pro Admin	Confirmed by voice vote on November 7, 1791
William Paterson	Washington	None	Pro Admin	Nomination withdrawn on February 28, 1793
William Paterson	Washington	None	Pro Admin	Confirmed by voice vote on March 4, 1793
John Rutledge	Washington	None	Federalist	Rejected (10–14) on December 15, 1795
William Cushing	Washington	None	Federalist	Confirmed (Note: Declined and continued to serve as an associate justice.) by voice vote on January 27, 1796
Samuel Chase	Washington	None	Federalist	Confirmed by voice vote on January 27, 1796
Oliver Ellsworth	Washington	None	Federalist	Confirmed (21–1) on March 4, 1796
Bushrod Washington	J. Adams	Federalist	Federalist	Confirmed by voice vote on December 20, 1798
Alfred Moore	J. Adams	Federalist	Federalist	Confirmed by voice vote on December 10, 1799
John Jay	J. Adams	Federalist	Federalist	Confirmed by voice vote on December 19, 1800
John Marshall	J. Adams	Federalist	Federalist	Confirmed by voice vote on January 27, 1801
William Johnson	Jefferson	Dem-Rep	Dem-Rep	Confirmed by voice vote on March 24, 1804
Henry B. Livingston	Jefferson	Dem-Rep	Dem-Rep	Confirmed by voice vote on December 17, 1806
Thomas Todd	Jefferson	Dem-Rep	Dem-Rep	Confirmed by voice vote on March 2, 1807
Levi Lincoln Sr.	Madison	Dem-Rep	Dem-Rep	Confirmed by voice vote on January 3, 1811
Alexander Wolcott	Madison	Dem-Rep	Dem-Rep	Rejected (9–24) on February 13, 1811
John Quincy Adams	Madison	Dem-Rep	Dem-Rep	Confirmed by voice vote on February 22, 1811
Joseph Story	Madison	Dem-Rep	Dem-Rep	Confirmed by voice vote on November 18, 1811
Gabriel Duvall	Madison	Dem-Rep	Dem-Rep	Confirmed by voice vote on November 18, 1811
General sources:

=== After the creation of the Judiciary Committee ===
List of nominations that were not referred to the Judiciary Committee
Nominee	Nominated by		Senate majority party	Outcome
Nominee	President	Party	Senate majority party	Outcome
Smith Thompson	Monroe	Dem-Rep	Dem-Rep	Confirmed by voice vote on December 9, 1823
Robert Trimble	J. Q. Adams	Adams Rep	Jacksonian	Confirmed (27–5) on May 9, 1826
John McLean	Jackson	Jacksonian	Jacksonian	Confirmed by voice vote on March 7, 1829
Henry Baldwin	Jackson	Jacksonian	Jacksonian	Confirmed (41–2) on January 6, 1830
Roger B. Taney (first nomination)	Jackson	Democratic	Natl Rep	Postponed (23–22) on March 3, 1835
Peter Vivian Daniel	Van Buren	Democratic	Democratic	Confirmed (25–5) on March 2, 1841
George E. Badger	Fillmore	Whig	Democratic	Postponed (26–15) on February 11, 1853
Jeremiah S. Black	Buchanan	Democratic	Democratic	Lapsed (Note: A motion to bring the nomination up for discussion was defeated 25–26 on February 21, 1861.)
Samuel Freeman Miller	Lincoln	Republican	Republican	Confirmed by voice vote on July 16, 1862
Salmon P. Chase	Lincoln	Republican	Republican	Confirmed by voice vote on December 6, 1864
Edwin Stanton	Grant	Republican	Republican	Confirmed (Note: Died prior to becoming a member of the Court.) (46–11) by voice vote on December 20, 1869
Edward D. White	Cleveland	Democratic	Democratic	Confirmed by voice vote on February 19, 1894
Edward D. White	Taft	Republican	Republican	Confirmed by voice vote on December 12, 1910
William Howard Taft	Harding	Republican	Republican	Confirmed by voice vote on June 30, 1921
George Sutherland	Harding	Republican	Republican	Confirmed by voice vote on September 5, 1922
James F. Byrnes	F. D. Roosevelt	Democratic	Democratic	Confirmed by voice vote on June 12, 1941
General sources:
