= Louis Brandeis Supreme Court nomination =

US Supreme Court nomination

- Nominee: Louis Brandeis
- Nominated by: Woodrow Wilson (president of the United States)
- Succeeding: Joseph Rucker Lamar (associate justice)
- Date nominated: January 28, 1916
- Date confirmed: June 1, 1916
- Outcome: Confirmed by the U.S. Senate

Vote of subcommittee of the Senate Judiciary Committee
- Votes in favor: 3
- Votes against: 2
- Result: Reported favorably

Full Senate Judiciary Committee vote
- Votes in favor: 10
- Votes against: 8
- Result: Reported favorably

Senate confirmation vote
- Votes in favor: 47
- Votes against: 22
- Not voting: 27
- Result: Confirmed

Louis Brandeis was nominated to serve as an associate justice of the Supreme Court of the United States by U.S. President Woodrow Wilson on January 28, 1916, after the death in office of Joseph Rucker Lamar created a vacancy on the Supreme Court. Per the Constitution of the United States, Brandeis' nomination was subject to the advice and consent of the United States Senate, which holds the determinant power to confirm or reject nominations to the U.S. Supreme Court.

Brandeis' nomination attracted significant opposition and controversy. This partially arose from his reputation and record as a lawyer of being regarded a "people's lawyer" hostile towards corporate interests. Brandeis had a record of opposing monopolies, criticizing investment banks, and advocating for workers' rights. Concerns were raised about the "radicalism" of Brandeis. Opposition also arose from antisemitism due to Brandeis being the first Jewish nominee to the Supreme Court of the United States. The nomination was opposed by corporate leaders, such as J. P. Morgan Jr. William Howard Taft (a former U.S. president and former American Bar Association president) organized opposition to the nomination among American Bar Association leaders. Taft and six other former presidents of the American Bar Association sent a letter to the Senate Committee on the Judiciary opposing the nomination. The nomination also came into strong opposition from members of the Boston Brahmin, an upper class group of the city of Boston that was associated with Harvard University. Among the most prominent in opposing the nomination were A. Lawrence Lowell (the president of Harvard University) and Henry Lee Higginson (a prominent patron of Harvard University). Despite this, all but one member of the faculty of the Harvard Law School endorsed the nomination. Felix Frankfurter, among the Harvard Law School faculty member, was a particularly proactive supporter of the nomination. The nomination received liberal and progressive support. In addition, many prominent members of the American Jewish community supported the nomination.

Brandeis' nomination was subject to near-unprecedented confirmation hearings conducted by the Senate Committee on the Judiciary. The 125-day gap between his nomination and the full-Senate vote on confirming him to the court is by far the longest such gap for any U.S. Supreme Court nomination that was brought to a confirmation vote. The nomination ultimately received positive reports from both a subcommittee of the Judiciary Committee and from the full Judiciary Committee. Brandeis was confirmed to the court on June 1, 1916, in a 47–22 vote.

== Nomination by President Wilson ==
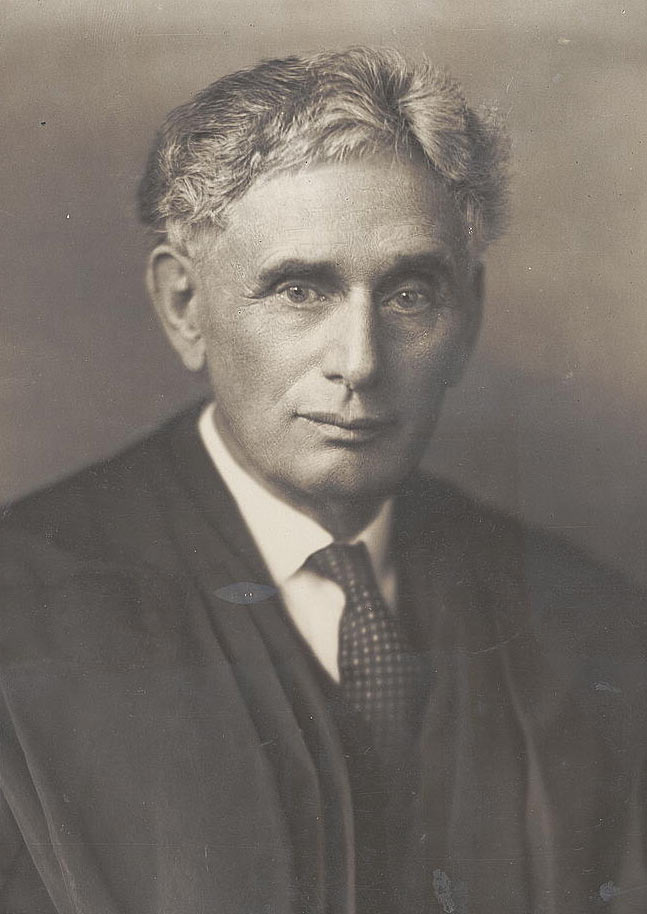
Brandeis circa 1916

On January 28, 1916, President Woodrow Wilson nominated Louis Brandeis to fill the associate justice seat on the Supreme Court of the United States left vacant by the death in office of Joseph Rucker Lamar. The nomination was then referred the Senate Committee on the Judiciary. Wilson's nomination of Brandeis was regarded as a great surprise. He had never come up in speculation about what individuals might fill the vacancy. It had not been expected that Wilson, up for what seemed like a difficult reelection battle eight months later in the 1916 United States presidential election, would nominate a controversial individual. It was reported that several senators gasped when the nomination was announced to the Senate chamber.

The New York Times' reporting shortly after the nomination was made credited Thomas Watt Gregory, the U.S. attorney general, with having made the successful recommendation to Wilson that Brandeis be appointed to the court. In making his selection, Wilson ignored the tradition of informing, and usually receiving the approval, of the U.S. Senators representing the nominee's home state. In Brandeis' case, the senators representing his home state of Massachusetts were Republican senators Henry Cabot Lodge and John W. Weeks. In fact, the only U.S. senator that Wilson, a Democrat, had his administration consult before announcing the selection of Brandeis was Robert La Follette, a progressive member of the Republican Party. Attorney General Gregory met with La Follette days after Justice Lamar's death and inquired as to whether La Follette would consider crossing party lines to vote to confirm Brandeis, which La Follette enthusiastically declared that he would. Brandeis had only been told of his nomination several days before it was formally made.

Brandeis, dubbed the "people's lawyer", was a controversial figure for his challenging of monopolies, criticism of investment banks, his advocacy for workers' rights, and his advocacy for protecting civil liberties. He was regarded as a "trust buster". Brandeis was among the nation's most noted Progressive reformers. Brandeis was also the first person of Jewish descent ever nominated the Supreme Court of the United States. President Wilson had commonality with Brandeis over their skepticism of large corporate power, with Wilson having been a stronger supporter of antitrust laws than either Theodore Roosevelt or William Howard Taft, who had been his main opponents in the 1912 United States presidential election. Brandeis had been an influential advisor, political confidante, and friend of Wilson since Wilson's 1912 campaign and had shaped Wilson's "The New Freedom" agenda. When he took office in 1913, Wilson had considered appointing Brandeis as his U.S. attorney general. However, corporate executives, particularly those from the banking and legal establishment of Brandeis' native Boston, launched active opposition to the appointment of Brandeis. Among motivations for this was backlash to Brandeis' legal battles against them, as well as antisemitic opposition to the prospect of Brandeis serving as the first Jewish attorney general. Consequentially, Wilson had decided at that time that he would be too controversial of an appointee. However, Wilson retained a desire to appoint Brandeis to either his Cabinet or to the Supreme Court.

Taking what appeared to be a political risk with his choice surprised many, especially considering the wide view that Wilson would already have a challenge being reelected. Incumbents had had difficulty getting reelected in previous decades. Since Ulysses Grant's reelection in 1872, only once had a president been elected in two consecutive elections (William McKinley in 1900). Additionally, Democrats were not viewed as favored in presidential elections at the time. Since the United States Civil War, the only Democratic wins in presidential elections had been Wilson's own 1912 victory, and Grover Cleveland's non-consecutive victories in the 1884 and 1892 elections. Furthermore, Wilson had won the 1912 election against a divided Republican Party, whose base of support split much of its vote between the party's nominee, Taft, and the third party run of Roosevelt. With a united Republican Party in the 1916 presidential election, it seemed even more possible that Wilson would be defeated.

While general political logic had caused many to see it as a surprise that Wilson would nominate such a controversial individual to the Supreme Court months before he was up for reelection as president, there may have been political calculations in his decision to nominate Brandeis. A likely motivation for Wilson's selection Brandeis to be his nominee for the Supreme Court may have been a desire to shore up his credentials as a political progressive before the upcoming 1916 presidential election. Some at the time of the nomination also believed he might also have been seeking to shore up Jewish support for his reelection, with The Nation writing on February 10, 1916, "old-fashioned politicians" read the nomination as, "bait for the Hebrew vote at the coming election."

The nomination of a Jewish man to the Court came, notably, amid a high point in antisemitism in the United States. The backdrop of the era included incidents such as the recent lynching of Leo Frank and the prominence of the Ku Klux Klan.

== Opposition to the nomination ==
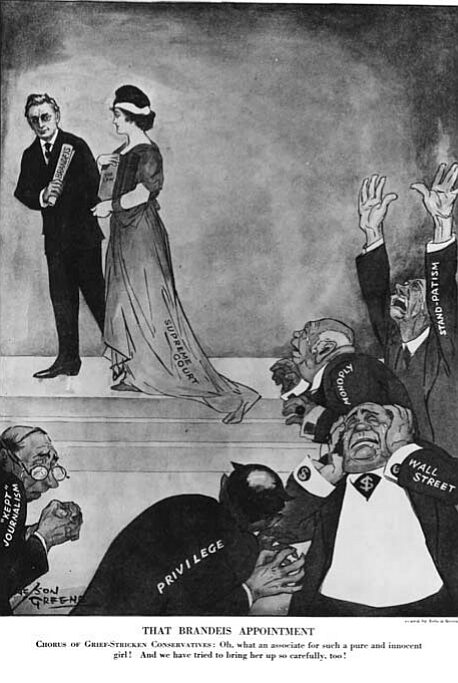
Political cartoon depicting a "Chorus of Grief Stricken Conservatives" as the Brandeis appointment dismays anthropomorphic depictions of "kept" journalism, privilege, Wall Street, monopoly, and stand-patism in a 1916 Puck cartoon

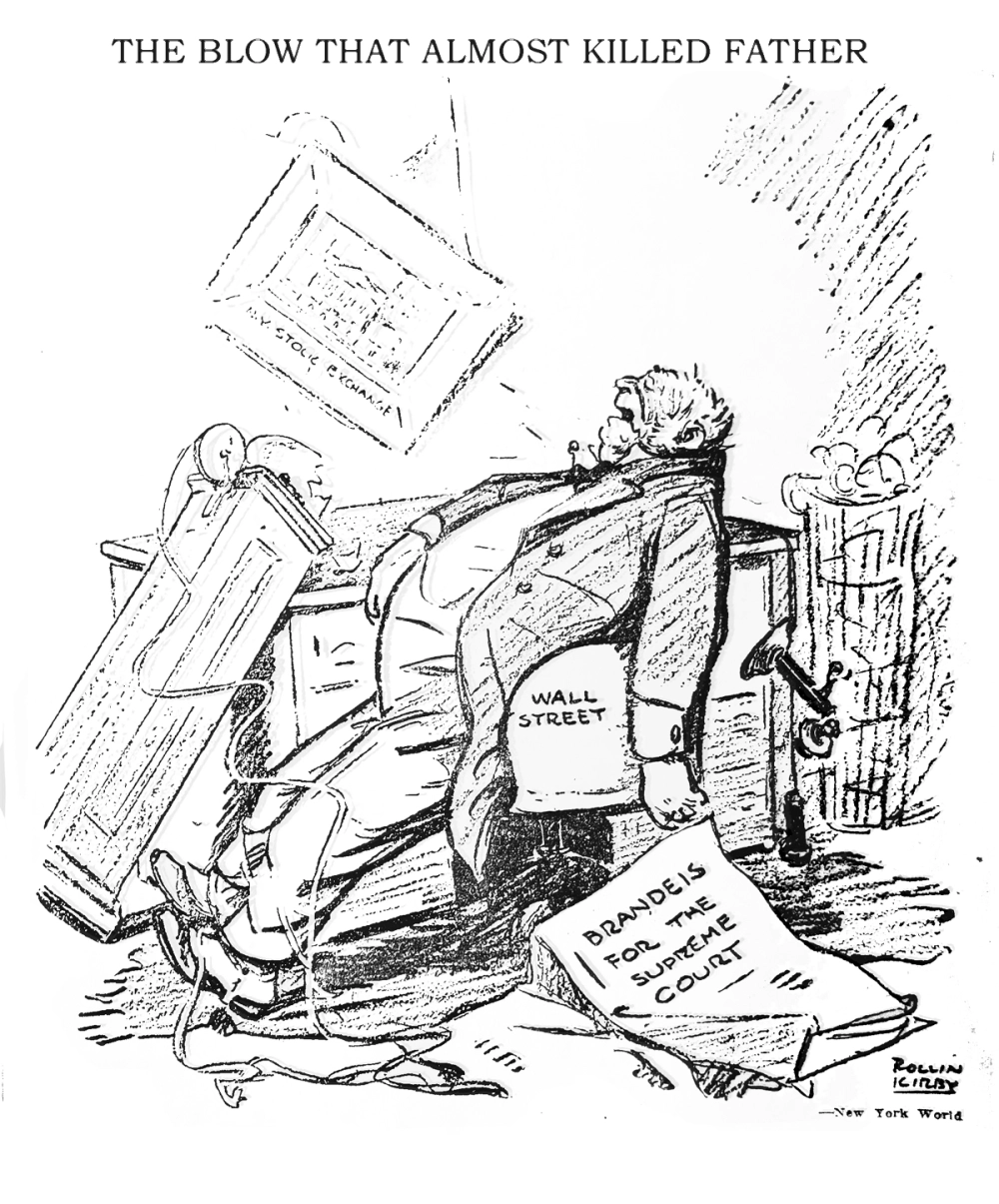
"The Blow That Almost Killed Father" by Rollin Kirby, a political cartoon published in the New York World depicting an anthropomorphized Wall Street reacting to "the blow" of Brandeis' nomination

Brandeis' nomination ignited an intense confirmation battle. Brandeis' nomination evoked a polarized and vocal reaction. The widespread attention and intense fight over the nomination was in contrast to most preceding Supreme Court nomination processes, which had been low-key and quiet. It was considered among the most contentious nominations up to that point.

Many opponents took issue with the "radicalism" of Brandeis. The nomination quickly received strong conservative backlash. The Sun newspaper of New York City expressed outrage that Brandeis, who they regarded as a radical, had been nominated for appointment to, "the stronghold of sane conservatism, the safeguard of our institutions, the ultimate interpreter of our fundamental law". Corporate leaders, such as J. P. Morgan Jr., stood in opposition to the nomination. The New York Times wrote in its front-page story after the nomination was made,

Outside of the near-sensation caused by the nomination of a man who had not been publicly mentioned for the highest judicial honors, the surprise over the President's selection of Mr. Brandeis was due to several distinct circumstances. The most striking of these, judged by the comment heard afterward at the Capitol, was the radicalism of Mr. Brandeis. Some of those who showed the most marked symptoms of dissatisfaction indicated that they regarded him as practically a Socialist.

Brandeis' later successor on the court, William O. Douglas, wrote many years later that the nomination of Brandeis "frightened the Establishment," because he was, "a militant crusader for social justice." He also wrote that, "the fears of the Establishment were greater because Brandeis was the first Jew to be named to the Court."

The New York Times and The Wall Street Journal were among the press outlets that most prominently opposed the nomination. The New York Times claimed that having been a noted "reformer" for so many years, Brandeis would lack the "dispassionate temperament that is required of a judge." The Wall Street Journal's editor, Clarence W. Barron, strongly opposed Brandeis' nomination. The Wall Street Journal wrote of Brandeis, "In all the anti-corporation agitation of the past, one name stands out... where others were radical, he was rabid." The New York Times conceded that even Brandeis' harshest detractors noted that he was a remarkably skilled lawyer, but many still contended that his abilities as a lawyer did not make him suited for the Supreme Court.

The opposition of Massachusetts U.S. Senator Henry Cabot Lodge was seen as a major concern, as it had been conventional for presidents to have first received the approval of the two Senators from a Supreme Court nominee's home state before making a nomination, or to at least notify them of their intention prior to making the nomination. Wilson had not done either. Lodge may have been able to block the nomination, as senior senator from Massachusetts, had the senator invoked the customary rule of Senatorial courtesy. However, Lodge did not do so despite holding both Wilson and Brandeis in strong public disdain. While he did urge American Bar Association leadership to oppose the nomination, Lodge did not play a major role in leading the opposition to the nomination, despite many anticipating that he would. One theory that was presented for why he did not was to not imperil his reelection in the upcoming 1916 United States Senate election in Massachusetts, fearing repercussions from Jewish and Catholic voters if he more actively opposed the nomination. Lodge himself had accused Wilson of only selecting Brandeis in order to win over Jewish voters in important states.

Upon the nomination's initial announcement, a number of Democratic senators voiced dissatisfaction with the nomination.

Among the nomination's most prominent opponents was A. Lawrence Lowell, the president of Harvard University. A letter circulated by Lowell received signatures from Lowell and fifty-four other influential figures including Charles Francis Adams Jr., R.W. Boyden, Julian Codman, Harold Jefferson Coolidge Sr., Malcolm Donald, A. R. Graustein, Patrick Tracy Jackson, Augustus Peabody Loring, Francis Peabody, William Lowell Putnam, Henry Lee Shattuck, and many other notable Boston Brahmins. Lowell sent the signed letter to his close friend Senator Henry Cabot Lodge, who entered the letter into the Congressional Record and then presented a copy to Senator William E. Chilton, who was the chairman of the Senate Committee on the Judiciary (Judiciary Committee) subcommittee that was undertaking the initial review and hearings on the nomination.

The campaign against Brandeis' confirmation received a large amount of its organizing and fundraising from Boston Brahmin figure Henry Lee Higginson, a longtime political foe of Brandeis who had earlier helped to finance an antisemitic campaign that contributed to the shelving of Brandeis' potential appointment by Wilson as U.S. attorney general.

Former president William Howard Taft strongly opposed the nomination. Taft's opposition, in part, had also been perhaps motivated by the fact that Taft had held out hope that Wilson might disregard partisan affiliations and appoint him to court. Taft, within days of the nomination being made, began organizing opposition to it among the leadership of the American Bar Association. Taft viewed the nomination as, "an evil disgrace". Taft, at one point, wrote,

It is one of the deepest wounds that I have had as an American and as a lover of the Constitution and a believer in progressive conservatism, that such as man as Brandeis could be put on the Court, as I believe he is likely to be. He is a muckraker, an emotionalist for his own purposes, a socialist, prompted by jealously, a hypocrite... who is utterly unscrupulous...a man of infinite cunning...of great tenacity of purpose, and, in my judgment, of much power for evil.

Many southern Democrats voiced opposition. This was, in part, due to many of them having expected that Justice Lamar (from the southern state of Georgia) would be replaced by a fellow southerner. Edward M. House reportedly expressed suspicion that some southern senators were concerned that Brandeis might attempt to undo the separate but equal doctrine.

=== Role of antisemitism ===
A factor in a number of senators' and others' opposition to Brandeis' nomination was antisemitism, though few senators publicly voiced their antisemitic motivations. However, the contribution of antisemitism to the opposition Brandeis faced was largely an open secret at the time. With attitudes at the time towards Judaism, Brandeis' religion alone could rightfully be seen as a major obstacle to his confirmation. While few publicly made antisemitic declarations about the nomination, a number of senators and other notable individuals opposed to the nomination sent private communications opposing Brandeis' confirmation that have since become publicly known and confirm that them here were antisemitic motives among some prominent opponents. Among individuals who sent antisemitic communications that have since publicly surfaced are Senator Henry Cabot Lodge.

A. Lawrence Lowell, among the most prominent opponents of the nomination, is regarded by many to have been an antisemite. As president of Harvard, Lowell would later attempt to impose a Jewish quota capping the number of Jews that would be granted admission to the university. However, while many believed Lowell's opposition to Brandeis was rooted in his antisemitism, Brandeis himself viewed Lowell's opposition as driven by social class prejudice, writing so in private. Antisemitism is a potential factor in many Southern Democrats voicing initial opposition to the nomination. Antisemitism is seen as a key factor in the decision for the unprecedented public Senate Judiciary Committee hearings held on Brandeis' confirmation. Throughout the confirmation battle, Brandeis downplayed his religion, even declining an offer by supporters to organize the collection of signatures from Jewish lawyers in support of his confirmation.

George Woodward Wickersham, the president of the New York City Bar Association and the former U.S. attorney general under Taft, attacked supporters of Brandeis' nomination as, "A bunch of Hebrew uplifters." William F. Fitzgerald, a notable conservative Boston Democrat and a longtime political opponent of Brandeis, wrote that, "the fact that a slimy fellow of this kind by his smoothness and intrigue, together with his Jewish instinct can be appointed to the Court should teach an object lesson" to true Americans.

Former president William Howard Taft sent a four-page letter to journalist Gus Karger, who was Jewish himself, that accused Brandeis of having only recently embraced his Judaism and adopted zionism as an unsuccessful ploy to get appointed as attorney general of the United States. Despite this letter invoking Brandeis' Judaism critically, Taft is not believed to have been an antisemite, having been regarded to have enjoyed close relations with the Jewish community in his native city of Cincinnati; having had a number of Jewish political confidants; and notably having, as president, appointed Julian Mack as the first Jewish federal judge on a United States court of appeals. Additionally, Taft was reportedly dismayed with Wickersham's comments.

Opponents utilized antisemitic stereotypes. For instance, some cast Brandeis, who actually conducted much of his legal work pro bono, as "money grubbing". This invoked economic antisemitism. Many of those same opponents, somewhat contradictorily accused Brandeis of also being a socialist.

== Prominent supporters of the nomination ==
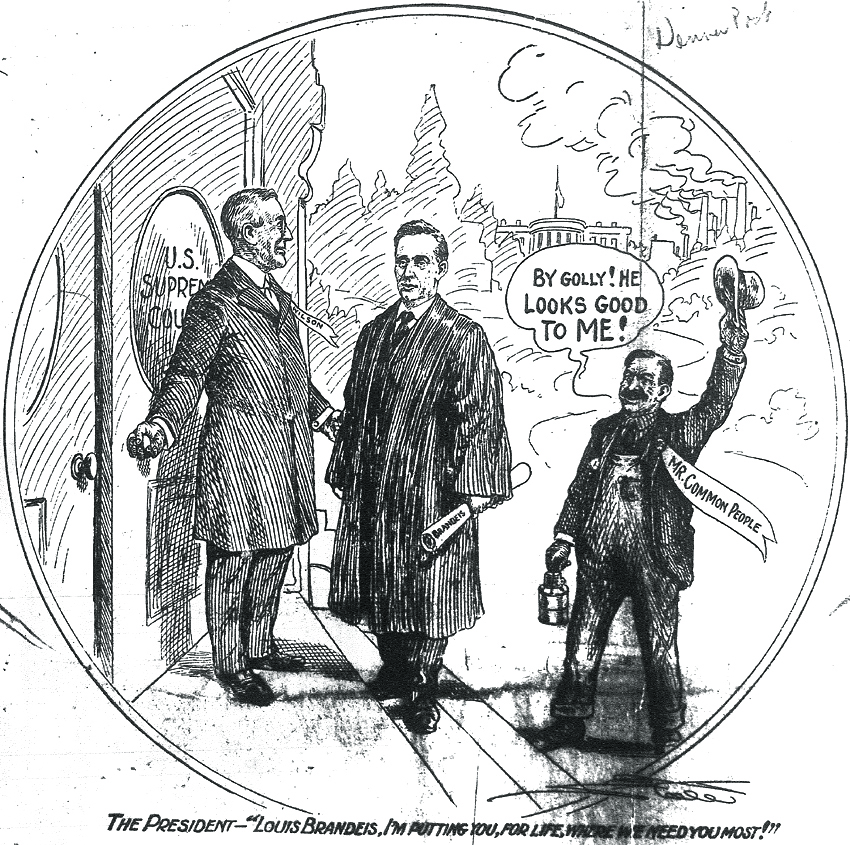
Political cartoon published February 6, 1916 in The Denver Post depicting "Mr. Common People" cheering as President Wilson brings Brandeis to the Supreme Court. Wilson himself exclaims, "Louis Brandeis, I'm putting you, for life, where we need you most!"

Throughout the confirmation fight, President Wilson stood by his nominee, and Brandeis' confirmation was regarded as a significant victory for Wilson. The president called Brandeis a, "friend of all just men and a lover of the right." Liberal politicians expressed support for the nomination, including many progressives in the Republican Party and reform-minded members of Wilson's Democratic Party. The nomination had many prominent and influential supporters, including a number of noted attorneys, social workers, and reformers with whom Brandeis had previously worked.

Harvard Law School faculty, with one non-participant, gave a public endorsement to Brandeis' nomination. This was, in large part, due to the work of Brandeis' friend and intimate political ally Felix Frankfurter, who had been appointed to the law school's faculty the previous year in part upon a strong recommendation by Brandeis himself to Dean Roscoe Pound. Frankfurter mobilized nine of his fellow ten fellow faculty to endorse Brandeis' nomination. Frankfurter wrote, throughout the four-month period before Brandeis was confirmed, a number of editorial pieces, letters, and articles in magazines in support of Brandeis' nomination. This included an unsigned editorial published by on February 5, 1916, in The New Republic reviewing the accomplishments of Brandeis and praising his judicial qualities and hailing Brandeis as seeking, "to make the great reconciliation between order and justice." At the urging of Frankfurter, Harvard Law School Dean Pound wrote a letter to Senator Chilton in praise of Brandeis' appointment. Similarly, such a letter was also written to Chilton and the subcommittee by former Harvard University President Charles W. Eliot, a highly regarded figure. Harvard Law School Dean Roscoe Pound testified during he Judiciary Committee hearings that, "Brandeis was one of the great lawyers," and predicted that he would one day rank "with the best who have sat upon the bench of the Supreme Court."

Walter Lippmann (the editor of The New Republic and Harper's Weekly) and the editors of La Follette's Weekly helped to coordinate a publicity campaign in support of the nomination. Additionally, notable individuals that wrote letters to the Senate Judiciary Committee in support of Brandeis' nomination included Newton Baker (the reform-minded mayor of Cleveland), writer Norman Hapgood, Walter Lippmann, Henry Morgenthau Sr. (former ambassador of the United States to the Ottoman Empire), labor activist Frances Perkins, and Rabbi Stephen Samuel Wise. Morgenthau was an especially involved proponent of the nomination.

On February 8, 1916, Samuel Seabury (associate judge of the New York Court of Appeals) delivered remarks to the Far Western Traveler's Association at the Hotel Astor in New York City. An excerpt of the speech was made available to the media. Seabury declared that, "the country is to be congratulated upon the nomination of Mr. Brandeis for associate justice of the Supreme Court. It is a most welcome nomination. His appointment would result in a benefit to the country and to the Supreme Court itself."

Upon the nomination being made, The New York Times speculated that, "the appointment might appeal to advocates of religious tolerance because Mr. Brandeis is of Jewish blood and a leader in the Zionist movement." Many prominent Jewish leaders, such as Jacob Schiff, organized in support of Brandeis' nomination. Jewish businessman Nathan Straus convinced journalist Arthur Brisbane to author an editorial in the New York Evening Journal supporting the nomination. Among the Jewish leaders that supported the nomination were some that had previously been critical of Brandeis.

== Judiciary Committee review ==
Since 1828, many Supreme Court nominations have been sent to the Senate Committee on the Judiciary for review. Since a Senate rule was adopted in 1868 requiring all nominations to be sent to an appropriate standing committee, it has been practice that nearly all Supreme Court nominations have been reviewed by the Judiciary Committee. However, before Brandeis, reviews by the Judiciary Committee of nominations had been brief and closed to the public. Contrary to previous practice, the review of Brandeis' nomination lasted months and featured public hearings. It was not until June 1, 1916, more than four months after the nomination was made, that the Judiciary Committee ended its review.

Brandeis' Judiciary Committee review featured hearings by the Judiciary Committee's which took place over a four-month period. Before Brandeis' nomination, there had been only one recorded instance in which hearings had been conducted as part of a Judiciary Committee review of a Supreme Court nominee, with two closed door hearings having been held on December 16 and 17, 1873 on the nomination of George Henry Williams.

The purported reasons given for why there were to be hearings held on Brandeis' nomination were concerns about assertions that he was a controversial liberal, a supposedly dangerous radical, and that he might lack "judicial temperament". However, actual motivations for holding hearings on Brandeis' nomination came from both antisemitism against Brandeis and from disdain for the public-interest work that had earned Brandeis a reputation as the "People's Lawyer". Opponents of Brandeis' nomination publicly played down antisemitic motivations. Senator Lee Slater Overman claimed that the hearings were needed because the nomination had come as "a great surprise," and that senators therefore needed "to get all the facts available about the nominee." The Chicago Tribune speculated that the hearings were going to be held because, "enemies of Mr. Brandeis think one of the surest ways of beating him is to hold a series of hearings.". The International News Service believed that the unprecedented move to hold open hearings on a Supreme Court nomination was due to, "the precedent-destroying fact that Mr. Brandeis is a Jew". Brandeis' religion was an unspoken factor in the hearings, however. The published testimony and reports from the hearings show only one instance when Brandeis' Jewish faith was given any mention, with Boston-based lawyer Francis Peabody on March 2, 1916, testifying that he had not known of Brandeis' faith at the time of a past matter involving Brandeis, and that it had "made no difference as far as my opinion of him goes" when Brandeis' faith was later publicized.

Unlike preceding Supreme Court confirmation reviews by the Judiciary Committee, the hearings held into Brandeis took on characteristics of a trial. Brandeis was accused of a number of allegations levied against his character, and advocates argued both sides of these cases. Witnesses and evidence were presented. The members of the subcommittee and later the full Judiciary Committee stood to deliver what amounted to a verdict on the allegations against Brandeis as it related to his suitability for the court. In the entire hearing process, forty-six witnesses were heard. Over the course of the hearings, it was unclear whether Brandeis' nomination would ultimately succeed or fail. Proponents and opponents of Brandeis' confirmation alike hoped to use the hearings to persuade senators who were undecided about the nomination. Brandeis refused to personally testify in the hearings. However, he was involved in guiding what amounted to a defense, frequently providing documents, records, and advice to those who were advocating for him in Washington, D.C. The arguments made against Brandeis largely did not focus on the ideological agenda he might pursue but instead accused Brandeis of past ethical misconduct.

=== Subcommittee hearings ===
Within a day of the nomination being made, a Judiciary Committee subcommittee was formed to investigate the nomination and proceeded to schedule for hearings to be held on the nomination. The subcommittee was chaired by Democrat William E. Chilton, with its remaining membership consisting of Democrats Duncan U. Fletcher, Thomas J. Walsh and Republicans Clarence D. Clark and Albert Cummins. The hearings held by the subcommittee were open to the public, unlike the hearings for George Henry Williams, which had been closed door. On January 31, the Judiciary Committee officially referred the nomination to the subcommittee. Brandeis refused to personally testify, but provided assistance and cooperation with those who were advocating on his behalf in the hearings. At the time that the hearings began in early February, Brandeis stayed in Boston and declared to reporters, "I have nothing whatever to say; I have not said anything and will not."

The statements, documents, and questioning of the hearings amounted to 1,590 pages of documents. Forty-three witnesses testified before the subcommittee, with testimony being recorded by a stenographer and subsequently printed in a 1,316 page volume. Witnesses testified both in support and against the nomination. Hearings were held on February 9 and 10, February 15–18, February 24–26, February 29–March 4, March 6–8, and March 14 and 15. These nineteen days of hearings are far more than the number of days of hearings that have been given to any other Supreme Court nominee. On February 16, Republican John D. Works was added to the subcommittee in the place of Senator Clark.

The hearings before the subcommittee saw prominent witnesses brought in to cast Brandeis as unfit to serve on the court. Opponents did not challenge Brandeis' legal credentials, but rather that attacked his reputation. Negative testimony was given that Brandeis was unprofessional, unethical, unfit in character. Negative testimony was also given that Brandeis was an activist incapable of being an impartial justice. Supporters of Brandeis countered that these were unfounded attacks lodged by "privileged interests". Brandeis' anti-corporate record was attacked. The hearing looked at years of cases, litigation, activities of Brandeis, and other matters that were considered consequential at the time. Chief among those arguing before the committee in opposition to Brandeis' confirmation was former Harvard president A. Lawrence Lowell, who effectively took on the role of leading the opposition. Austen George Fox was retained to act in a role akin to a prosecutor against Brandeis. At the request of the Judiciary Committee, Judge George W. Anderson took on the role of arguing the case in support of Brandeis' confirmation, a role akin to a defense attorney.

Among those to testify were Clarence W. Barron, Moorfield Storey, and Sherman L. Whipple. Barron made negative accusations against Brandeis, accusing him of having violated professional ethics as a lawyer by representing both sides in a case related to the United Shoe Machinery Company. Storey criticized Brandeis and Whipple gave a testimony positive towards Brandeis. In March, at the close of the hearings by the subcommittee, seven former American Bar Association presidents (Joseph H. Choate Jr., Peter Meldrim, Elihu Root, Francis Rawle, Moorfield Storey, and William Howard Taft) sent a written statement to the committee that harshly opposed Brandeis' nomination. The letter declared,

The undersigned feel under the painful duty to say to you that in their opinion, taking into view the reputation, character and professional career of Mr. Louis D. Brandeis, he is not a fit person to be a member of the Supreme Court of the United States.

=== Subcommittee report ===
Judiciary subcommittee vote on reporting favorably on the nomination
April 1, 1916	Party		Total votes
April 1, 1916	Democratic	Republican	Total votes
Yea	3	0	3
Nay	0	2	2
Result: Reported favorably
Roll call vote on reporting favorably: Senator / Party / State / Vote; William E. Chilton / D / West Virginia / Yea; Albert B. Cummins / R / Iowa / Nay; Duncan U. Fletcher / D / Florida / Yea; Thomas J. Walsh / D / Montana / Yea; John D. Works / R / California / Nay; Sources:

On April 1, 1916, by a party-line vote of 3–2 (with all Democrats voting to report favorably and all Republicans voting against reporting favorably), the subcommittee voted to give a favorable report on Brandeis' nomination to the full Judiciary Committee. On April 3, the subcommittee issued their favorable majority report on the nomination written by Senator Chilton to the full Judiciary Committee. Senator Fletcher concurred with the majority report, while Senator Walsh filed a separate favorable report, having disagreed with Chilton's majority report on several facts. Senators Cummins and Works wrote a minority report of the subcommittee against the nomination. The minority report argued that the twelve specific allegations that were made against Brandeis cast strong doubt on his ethics and integrity and argued that there would therefore be possible impropriety in appointing him the Supreme Court.

One of the numerous accusations made against Brandeis during the hearings was that he had advised and assisted Samuel D. Warren in a breach of trust in fraud of his brother Edward P. Warren. Clinton's majority report found that charge to be, "wholly unfounded and recognized to be by the leading counsel for Edward P. Warren in the suit concerning this trust," and noted that, "the propriety of Mr. Brandeis's conduct in this case was also recognized by one of his leading opponents who was counsel for other beneficiaries of the trust". On an accusation that Brandeis was working for the New York, New Haven, & Hartford Railroad to wreck the New York & New England Railroad Company, the majority report opined that, "the facts do not sustain this charge". The United Shoe Machinery Company had accused Brandeis of unprofessional conduct in obtaining information while associated with the company and later using this information in the interest of other clients. This related to their tying-clause system, However, the majority report emphasized the fact that three and a half years had elapsed before Brandeis had advised any clients on this subject, and found that he made no use of confidential information and instead had used facts that, "seem to have been public property well known to the shoe manufacturers". There were many other allegations and insinuations of improper and unprofessional conduct by Brandeis that the majority report found unsupported.

=== Full committee hearings ===
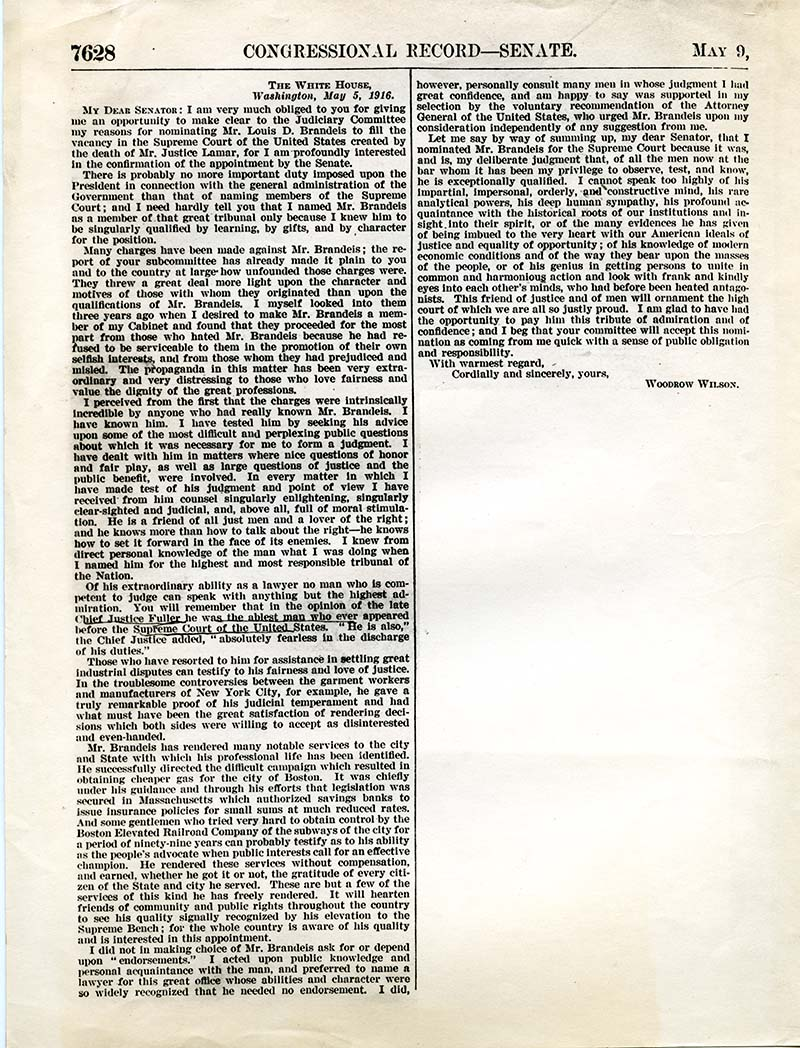
Page of the Congressional Record reprinting the letter that President Wilson sent to the Senate Judiciary Committee on May 4, 1916

After the subcommittee ended hearings in March, the full committee began further hearings in May. At one point Brandeis considered testifying, but ultimately did not. During the time of these hearings, Brandeis personally met in Washington, D.C. at the personal residence of the publisher of Harper's Weekly with two senators who were on the fence about his nomination.

These hearings featured many businessmen's testimony against Brandeis' nomination. During this time, enemies of the nomination also circulated a document with false accusations of involvement by Brandeis in legal efforts to retrieve love letters sent by Wilson to a woman in Bermuda. It appeared, for a time, that the Judiciary Committee was poised to report negatively on the nomination. By mid-May it seemed that the committee would report without a recommendation, with reports being made that the Judiciary Committee had been unable to agree on approving a favorable report and that several Democratic members of the committee were against a favorable report and would instead support a motion to return the nomination to the Senate without making a full recommendation.

Committee Chairman Charles Allen Culberson was encouraged by Attorney General Gregory to request that Wilson provide a summary of reasons why he had nominated Brandeis to begin with. Wilson sent a letter May 4, 1916 which was received the following day. The letter outlined his reasons and declared that, "no one is more imbued to the very heart of our American ideals of justice and equality of opportunity...he is a friend of all just men and a lover of the right; and he knows more than how to talk about the right – he knows how to set it forward in the face of its enemies." The letter also urged the committee to promptly vote favorably on the nomination. The letter was entered into the Congressional Record on May 9, 1916.

=== Committee report ===
Judiciary Committee vote on reporting favorably on the nomination
May 24, 1916	Party		Total votes
May 24, 1916	Democratic	Republican	Total votes
Yea	10	0	10
Nay	0	8	8
Result: Reported favorably
Roll call vote on reporting favorably: Senator / Party / State / Vote; Henry F. Ashurst / D / Arizona / Yea; William Borah / R / Wyoming / Nay; Frank B. Brandegee / R / Connecticut / Nay; William E. Chilton / D / West Virginia / Yea; Charles Culberson / D / Texas / Yea; Clarence D. Clark / R / Wyoming / Nay; Albert B. Cummins / R / Iowa / Nay; William P. Dillingham / R / Vermont / Nay; Duncan U. Fletcher / D / Florida / Yea; Knute Nelson / R / Montana / Nay; James Aloysius O'Gorman / D / New York / Yea; Lee Slater Overman / D / North Carolina / Yea; James A. Reed / D / Missouri / Yea; John K. Shields / D / Tennessee / Yea; M. Hoke Smith / D / Georgia / Yea; George Sutherland / R / Utah / Nay; Thomas J. Walsh / D / Montana / Yea; John D. Works / R / California / Nay; Source:

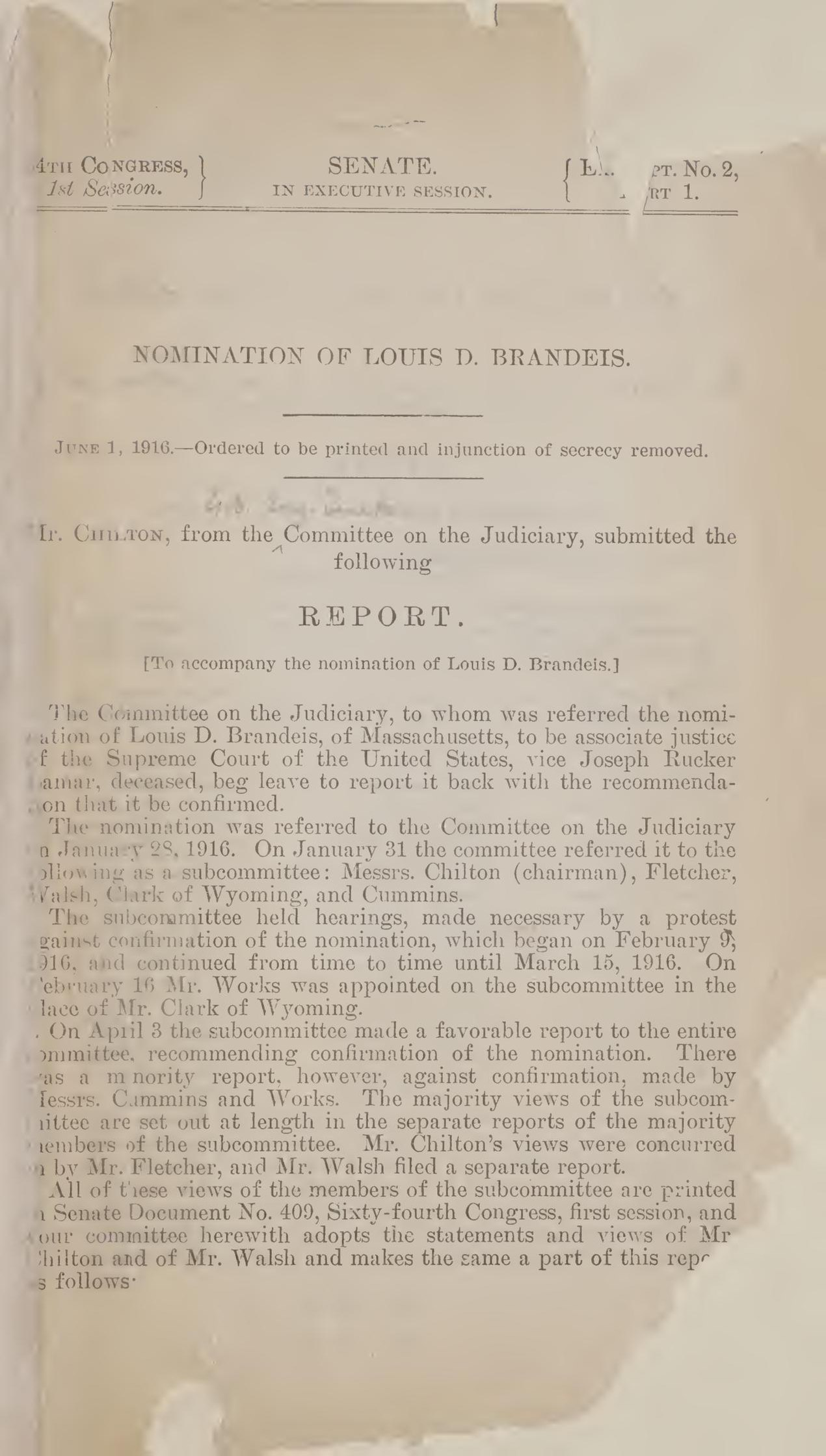
First page of the printed Judiciary Committee report on the nomination

On May 24, 1916, in a 10–8 vote, the Judiciary Committee voted to report favorably on Brandeis' nomination. The vote was a party-line vote, with all Democrats voting in support of reporting favorably, and all Republicans voting against it. While Senator Albert B. Cummins was physically absent, his vote against the nomination was allowed to be counted.

The committee's majority report defended Brandeis against allegations that had been raised of alleged misconduct. It also made a point that Brandeis would not be the first Supreme Court judge appointed amid what it contended were tense and unjust attacks. It also claimed that letters and petitions in support of the nomination significantly outweighed the opposition raised to the nomination.

The committee's minority report alleged that twelve allegations of misconduct by Brandeis had been sustained by evidence and that it had been proven that Brandeis had a bad reputation among lawyers of the Boston bar. It argued that Brandeis had his integrity more seriously questioned than any prior justice appointed to the Supreme Court and that his nomination had lowered the standard for appointment to the court.

After the vote, The New York Times wrote,

As a finding upon the charges it would have been more satisfactory had the party lines been broken, but the report does incontestably show that the evidence given in the protracted hearing failed to convince a majority of the committee that any of the charges against the professional standing and character of Mr. Brandeis was sustained in such a manner and degree as to warrant an adverse report.

In a memorable editorial, The New York Times continued to voice the opinion that Brandeis was suited not for the courts, but was rather suited for the legislature. It complained that Brandeis was,

Essentially a contender, a striver for changes and reforms that, under our system of Government, can be properly achieved only through legislation, not through the judgments of the courts."

The New York Times also wrote,

The Supreme Court, by its very nature, must be a conservative body; it is the conservator of our institutions, it protects the people against the errors of their legislative servants, it is the defender of the Constitution itself. To place upon the Supreme Bench judges who hold a different view of the function of the court, to supplant conservatism by radicalism, would be to undo the work of John Marshall and strip the Constitution of its defenses.

== Confirmation vote ==
On June 1, 1916, the Senate voted 47–22 to confirm Brandeis. The 125-day period between Wilson's nomination of Brandeis and the vote to confirm him is the longest time between a nomination of the United States Supreme Court nominee and a vote on confirmation by a significant margin. No debate was held before the vote. A compromise had been struck in which the Senate would forgo debate but would authorize the publication of the majority and minority reports of the Judiciary Committee. There was a large degree of pairing between absent senators, in which senators who would have voted opposite from one another if present agreed to both be absent from the vote, with their own absence being offset by the absence of the senator with which they were paired. Twenty-seven Senators were absent from the vote. Many of the Republican senators absent for the vote were instead busying themselves with preparations for the 1916 Republican National Convention in Chicago. It is possible that some Republican senators desired to be absent so that they could avoid voting for Brandeis (who they opposed) without outright voting against him (which they feared could lose them support from Jewish voters).

The three Republican senators that cast votes in support of confirming Brandeis (Robert M. La Follette, George W. Norris, and Miles Poindexter) were all staunch political progressives.

Despite there being prominent Ku Klux Klan-inspired antisemitism at the time, the vote was mostly a party-line vote. None of the Southern Democrats that were present voted against the nomination, despite there being complex politics in the South regarding Jewish Americans. Francis G. Newlands was sole Democratic senator to vote against the nomination. In explaining his vote against Brandeis' confirmation, Newlands characterized Brandeis as a talented, "publicist and propagandist," and remarked, "I do not regard him as a man of judicial temperament, and for that reason I have voted against his confirmation". Newlands' vote against confirming Brandeis had come as a surprise. The support Brandeis received from all other Democrats present for the vote was, perhaps, reflective of the power the Wilson had in his party. Wilson was seen as helping the Democratic Party win the U.S. Senate, as they had won control of the Senate in 1912, alongside Wilson's victory, and had won five more seats in the midterm election of 1914.

Vote to confirm the Brandeis nomination
June 1, 1916	Party		Total votes
June 1, 1916	Democratic	Republican	Total votes
Yea	44	3	47
Nay	1	21	22
Not voting	11	16	27
Result: Confirmed
Roll call vote on the nomination: Senator / Party / State / Vote; Henry F. Ashurst / D / Arizona / Yea; John H. Bankhead / D / Alabama / Yea; John Beckham / D / Kentucky / Yea; William Borah / R / Idaho / Not voting; James H. Brady / R / Idaho / Nay; Frank B. Brandegee / R / Connecticut / Nay; Robert F. Broussard / D / Louisiana / Yea; Nathan P. Bryan / D / Florida / Not voting; Edwin Burleigh / R / Maine / Not voting; Thomas B. Catron / R / New Mexico / Not voting; George Earle Chamberlain / D / Oregon / Yea; William E. Chilton / D / West Virginia / Yea; Moses E. Clapp / R / Minnesota / Not voting; Clarence D. Clark / R / Wyoming / Nay; James Paul Clarke / D / Arkansas / Not voting; LeBaron Bradford Colt / R / Rhode Island / Not voting; Charles Allen Culberson / D / Texas / Yea; Albert B. Cummins / R / Iowa / Nay; Charles Curtis / R / Kansas / Nay; William P. Dillingham / R / Vermont / Nay; Henry A. du Pont / R / Delaware / Nay; Albert B. Fall / R / New Mexico / Nay; Duncan U. Fletcher / D / Florida / Yea; Jacob Harold Gallinger / R / New Hampshire / Nay; Nathan Goff Jr. / R / West Virginia / Not voting; Thomas Gore / D / Oklahoma / Yea; Asle Gronna / R / North Dakota / Not voting; Warren G. Harding / R / Ohio / Nay; Thomas Hardwick / D / Georgia / Yea; Gilbert Hitchcock / D / Nebraska / Yea; Henry F. Hollis / D / New Hampshire / Yea; William Hughes / D / New Jersey / Yea; Paul O. Husting / D / Wisconsin / Yea; Ollie James / D / Kentucky / Yea; Charles Fletcher Johnson / D / Maine / Not voting; Edwin S. Johnson / D / South Dakota / Not voting; Wesley Livsey Jones / R / Washington / Not voting; William S. Kenyon / R / Iowa / Not voting; John W. Kern / D / Indiana / Yea; Robert M. La Follette / R / Wisconsin / Yea; Harry Lane / D / Oregon / Yea; Luke Lea / D / Tennessee / Yea; Blair Lee / D / Maryland / Yea; J. Hamilton Lewis / D / Illinois / Yea; Henry Lippitt / R / Rhode Island / Nay; Henry Cabot Lodge / R / Massachusetts / Nay; Thomas S. Martin / D / Virginia / Not voting; James Edgar Martine / D / New Jersey / Not voting; Porter J. McCumber / R / North Dakota / Not voting; George P. McLean / R / Connecticut / Not voting; Henry L. Myers / D / Montana / Yea; Knute Nelson / R / Minnesota / Nay; Francis G. Newlands / D / Nevada / Nay; George W. Norris / R / Nebraska / Yea; James Aloysius O'Gorman / D / New York / Yea; George T. Oliver / R / Pennsylvania / Nay; Lee Slater Overman / D / North Carolina / Yea; Robert Latham Owen / D / Oklahoma / Yea; Carroll S. Page / R / Vermont / Nay; Boies Penrose / R / Pennsylvania / Not voting; James D. Phelan / D / California / Yea; Key Pittman / D / Nevada / Yea; Miles Poindexter / R / Washington / Yea; Atlee Pomerene / D / Ohio / Not voting; Joseph E. Ransdell / D / Louisiana / Yea; James Reed / D / Missouri / Yea; Joseph Taylor Robinson / D / Arkansas / Not voting; Willard Saulsbury Jr. / D / Delaware / Yea; John F. Shafroth / D / Colorado / Yea; Morris Sheppard / D / Texas / Yea; Lawrence Yates Sherman / R / Illinois / Not voting; John K. Shields / D / Tennessee / Yea; Furnifold McLendel Simmons / D / North Carolina / Yea; Ellison D. Smith / D / South Carolina / Yea; M. Hoke Smith / D / Georgia / Yea; John Walter Smith / D / Maryland / Yea; Marcus A. Smith / D / Arizona / Yea; William Alden Smith / R / Michigan / Nay; Reed Smoot / R / Utah / Not voting; Thomas Sterling / R / South Dakota / Nay; William J. Stone / D / Missouri / Yea; George Sutherland / R / Utah / Nay; Claude A. Swanson / D / Virginia / Not voting; Thomas Taggart / D / Indiana / Yea; Charles S. Thomas / D / Colorado / Yea; William Howard Thompson / D / Kansas / Yea; Benjamin Tillman / D / South Carolina / Not voting; Charles E. Townsend / R / Michigan / Nay; Oscar Underwood / D / Alabama / Yea; James K. Vardaman / D / Mississippi / Yea; James W. Wadsworth Jr. / R / New York / Not voting; Thomas J. Walsh / D / Montana / Yea; Francis E. Warren / R / Wyoming / Nay; John W. Weeks / R / Massachusetts / Not voting; John Sharp Williams / D / Mississippi / Not voting; John D. Works / R / California / Nay; Source:

=== Pairing of absent senators ===
There was a large degree of pairing between absent senators, in which senators who would have cast votes opposite of each other if present agreed to both be absent from the vote, with their own absence being offset by the absence of the senator with which they were paired. Twenty-seven Senators were absent from the vote. The only three absent senators that were not paired with another absent senator were Senators James P. Clarke (D– AR), George P. McLean (R– CT), and Lawrence Yates Sherman (R– IL).

Pairing of absences
Senator that supported the nomination	Senator that opposed the nomination
Nathan P. Bryan (D–FL)	Thomas B. Catron (R–NM)
Asle Gronna (R–ND)	William Borah (R–ID)
Charles Fletcher Johnson (D–ME)	James Wolcott Wadsworth Jr. (R–NY)
Moses E. Clapp (R–MN)	William Kenyon (R–IA)
Edwin S. Johnson (D–SD)	LeBaron Bradford Colt (R–RI)
Thomas S. Martin (D–VA)	Porter J. McCumber (R–ND)
James Edgar Martine (D–NJ)	Reed Smoot (R–UT)
Atlee Pomerene (D–OH)	John W. Weeks (R–MA)
Joseph Taylor Robinson (D–AR)	Edwin Burleigh (R–ME)
Claude Swanson (D–VA)	Wesley Livsey Jones (R–WA)
Benjamin Tillman (D–SC)	Nathan Goff Jr. (R–WV)
John Sharp Williams (D–MS)	Boies Penrose (R–PA)

== Aftermath ==
Brandeis was sworn in as an associate justice on June 5, 1916, becoming the first Jewish member of the court. His investiture (swearing-in) ceremony was noted to have drawn a large and distinguished attendance in comparison to those that had recently preceded it. For his investiture, the Supreme Court chamber was filled with spectators, including several Cabinet members, members of the U.S. Senate, and members of the U.S. House of Representatives. Brandeis' confirmation was regarded as a significant victory for President Wilson, who remarked, "I never signed any commission with such satisfaction as I signed his." Brandeis joining the court as its first Jewish justice is regarded to be a milestone in Jewish American history. It was also perhaps a milestone marking the start to an end political leaders blocking the appointment of Jews to higher political positions.

Brandeis served on the court for twenty-three years. On the court, Brandeis continued to be a strong voice for progressivism. He is widely regarded as being among most important and the most influential justices in the history of the United States Supreme Court, often being ranked among the very "greatest" justices in the court's history. Upon his 1939 retirement from the court, The New York Times, which had so strongly opposed his nomination, issued great praise to his tenure on the court, hailing him as, "one of the great judges of our times."

Former president William Howard Taft, who spoke out against Brandeis' nomination, went on to serve on the court with him as chief justice. Taft respected and liked Brandeis when they served together on the court. George Sutherland, a senator who voted against Brandeis' nomination, also served with Brandeis as a fellow associate justice. Brandeis' close friend and ally Felix Frankfurter, who supported the nomination, was appointed to the court in 1939, very shortly before Brandeis' retirement.

Brandeis' confirmation process set a precedent of holding hearings about nominations. While there was only one recorded instance of a Supreme Court nomination having Judiciary Committee hearings prior to Brandeis' nomination, Judiciary Committee hearings have since become a regular practice for Supreme Court nominations. No nominee testified at their own confirmation hearings until Harlan F. Stone did so in 1925. Confirmation hearings became increasingly prevalent between 1925 and 1946. The 1946 nomination of Harold Hitz Burton is the most recent nomination to proceed to a confirmation vote without having had formal hearings while before the Senate Judiciary Committee.

A nomination of a justice to the Supreme Court was not anywhere near as contentious until the unsuccessful 1987 nomination of Robert Bork. A number of times since Brandeis, confirmation battles have taken a trial-like character in which nominees are made to answer past actions and justify their fitness for the court. These include the confirmation processes for Bork, Hugo Black, Abe Fortas' 1968 nomination to be chief justice, Charles Evans Hughes' 1930 confirmation as chief justice, and several more recent confirmation processes. Similarly to Brandeis, antisemitism likely played a role in the contentious nature of Abe Fortas' failed 1968 chief justice nomination.

== See also ==
- Woodrow Wilson Supreme Court candidates
- List of federal judges appointed by Woodrow Wilson
- List of nominations to the Supreme Court of the United States
