= Harlan F. Stone Supreme Court nominations =

United States Supreme Court nominations

Harlan F. Stone was nominated and confirmed twice to the Supreme Court of the United States. First in 1925, when President Calvin Coolidge nominated him to serve as an associate justice and again in 1941, when President Franklin D. Roosevelt nominated Justice Stone to be elevated to Chief Justice. Both times, the United States Senate confirmed the nominations.

== 1925 nomination for associate justice ==
Harlan Stone 1925 Supreme Court nomination
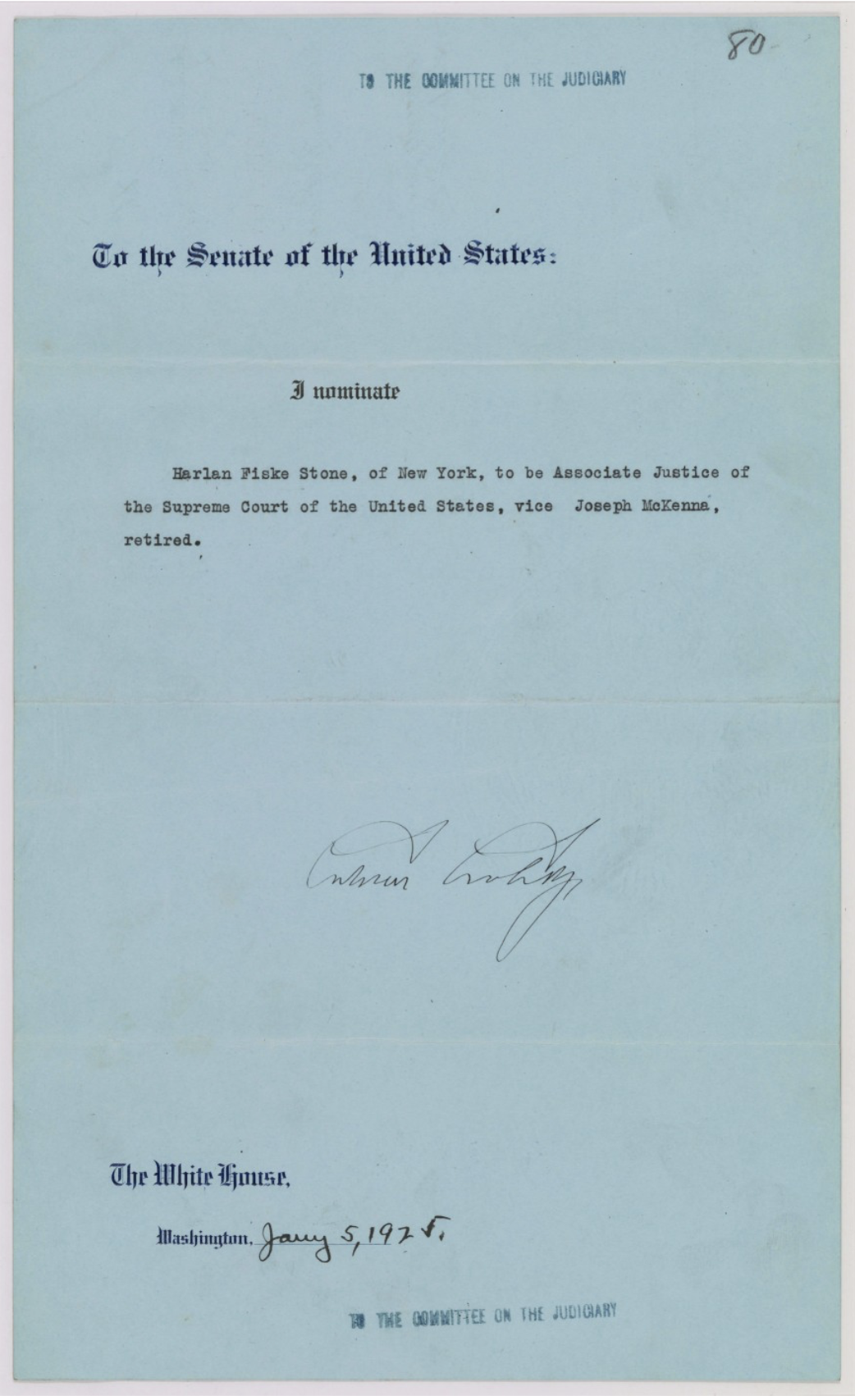
- Formal nomination signed by President Coolidge
- Nominee: Harlan F. Stone
- Nominated by: Calvin Coolidge (president of the United States)
- Succeeding: Joseph McKenna (associate justice)
- Date nominated: January 5, 1925
- Outcome: Approved by the Senate

First Senate Judiciary Committee vote
- Result: Reported favorably

Second Senate Judiciary Committee vote
- Result: Reported favorably

Senate confirmation vote
- Votes in favor: 71
- Votes against: 6
- Not voting: 19
- Result: Approved

In 1925, President Calvin Coolidge successfully nominated Harlan F. Stone to serve as an associate justice of the Supreme Court of the United States, filling the vacancy left by Joseph McKenna's retirement.

=== Nomination by President Coolidge ===
Shortly after President Coolidge won reelection in the 1924 United States presidential election, Justice McKenna retired from the Supreme Court. On January 5, 1925, Calvin Coolidge nominated Stone to replace McKenna as an Associate Justice. It does not appear that Coolidge considered any other candidates for the vacancy other than Stone. Stone himself had urged Coolidge to appoint Benjamin N. Cardozo.

Stone's nomination was greeted with general approval, although there were rumors that Stone might have been selected because of his antitrust activities. Some Senators raised concerns about Stone's connection to Wall Street making him a tool of corporate interests. He was widely regarded as having strong character, education, and temperament making him suited for the court.

=== Judiciary Committee reviews ===
==== First review ====
During their initial review of the nomination, the Senate Judiciary Committee held a single closed door hearing on January 12, 1925. In this hearing, they heard testimony from Willard Saulsbury Jr. The Senate Judiciary Committee gave Stone's nomination a favorable recommendation on January 21, 1925.

==== Second review ====
Senator Burton K. Wheeler, a progressive member of the Democratic Party, and others raised objections to the nomination due to Stone's nomination. It was alleged that a federal grand jury indictment of Wheeler was politically motivated under Stone's preview as U.S. attorney general, and that Stone had taken questionable actions in relation to the investigation. The Senate had examined the charges against Wheeler, exonerating Wheeler in the judgement of a Senate inquiry. However, Stone did not withdraw the indictment. It was alleged that the motivations of the indictment was due to Wheeler's investigating of Stone's predecessor as attorney general, Harry Daugherty, for his failure to prosecute parties involved in the Teapot Dome scandal. A Senate investigation led by Wheeler had forced Daugherty to resign.

Other concerns raised related to Stone's Wall Street connections.

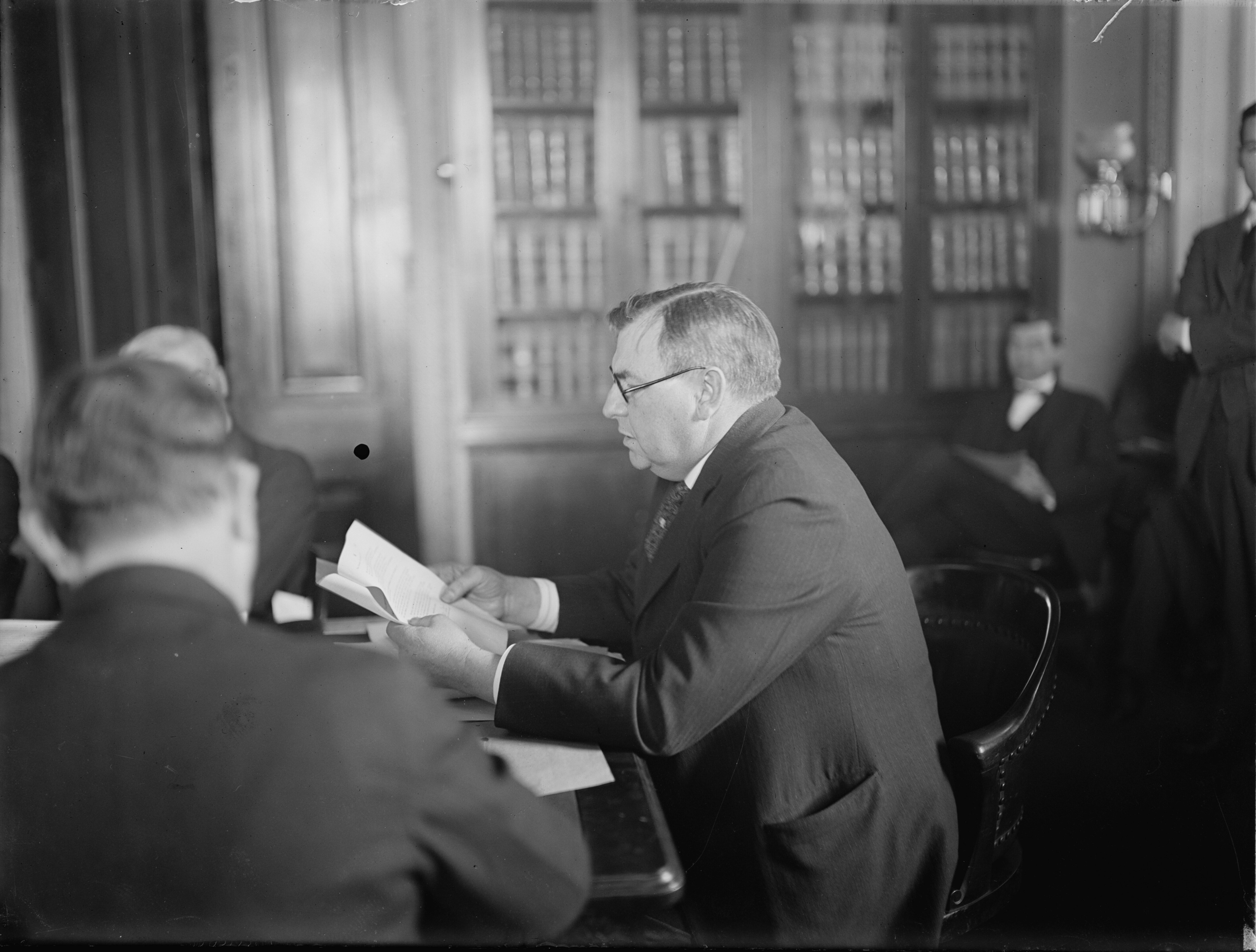
Stone appearing before the Senate Judiciary Committee on January 28, 1925

Based upon these concerns, on January 24, 1925, Wheeler-ally Senator Thomas J. Walsh persuaded the Senate to return the nomination to the Judiciary Committee for continued review. President Coolidge refused to withdraw his nomination of Stone. He agreed to a compromise that would see Stone provide an unprecedented testimony to the Judiciary Committee. No previous Supreme Court nominee had ever appeared before the Judiciary Committee.

To address concerns about his nomination, Stone proposed that he answer questions of the Senate Judiciary Committee in person. The nomination was returned by the Senate to committee on January 26, 1925. On January 28, Stone became the first Supreme Court nominee to testify before the Senate Judiciary Committee hearings on their nomination. The hearing was open to the public. and Stone was questioned on his role related to the Teapot Dome scandal. Stone performed well in his five hours of testimony. On February 2, 1925, the committee again gave his nomination an favorable recommendation.

=== Confirmation vote ===
On February 25, 1925, the full Senate then voted 60–27 to consider the nomination. Stone was thereafter confirmed by the Senate by a vote of 71–6 and received his commission the same day. On March 2, 1925, Stone took the oath as Associate Justice administered by Chief Justice William Howard Taft. He would prove to be Coolidge's only Supreme Court appointment.

Vote to confirm the Stone nomination
February 25, 1925	Party			Total votes
February 25, 1925	Democratic	Republican	Farmer–Labor	Total votes
Yea	27	44	0	71
Nay	2	2	2	6
Not voting	13	6	0	19
Result: Confirmed
Roll call vote on the nomination: Senator / Party / State / Vote; Henry F. Ashurst / D / Arizona / Yea; L. Heisler Ball / R / Delaware / Yea; Thomas F. Bayard Jr. / D / Delaware / Not voting; Hiram Bingham III / R / Connecticut / Yea; William Borah / R / Idaho / Yea; Smith W. Brookhart / R / Iowa / Yea; Edwin S. Broussard / D / Louisiana / Yea; William Cabell Bruce / D / Maryland / Yea; Holm O. Bursum / R / New Mexico / Yea; William M. Butler / R / Massachusetts / Yea; Ralph H. Cameron / R / Arizona / Yea; Arthur Capper / R / Kansas / Yea; Thaddeus H. Caraway / D / Arkansas / Not voting; Royal S. Copeland / D / New York / Yea; James J. Couzens / R / Michigan / Yea; Albert B. Cummins / R / Iowa / Yea; Charles Curtis / R / Kansas / Yea; Porter H. Dale / R / Vermont / Yea; Nathaniel B. Dial / D / South Carolina / Yea; Clarence Dill / D / Washington / Not voting; Walter Evans Edge / R / New Jersey / Yea; Edward I. Edwards / D / New Jersey / Yea; Davis Elkins / R / West Virginia / Not voting; Richard P. Ernst / R / Kentucky / Yea; Bert M. Fernald / R / Maine / Yea; Woodbridge N. Ferris / D / Michigan / Yea; Simeon D. Fess / R / Ohio / Yea; Duncan U. Fletcher / D / Florida / Yea; Lynn Frazier / R / North Dakota / Nay; Walter F. George / D / Georgia / Yea; Peter G. Gerry / D / Rhode Island / Not voting; Carter Glass / D / Virginia / Yea; Frank R. Gooding / R / Idaho / Yea; Frank L. Greene / R / Vermont / Yea; Frederick Hale / R / Maine / Yea; John W. Harreld / R / Oklahoma / Yea; William J. Harris / D / Georgia / Not voting; Pat Harrison / D / Mississippi / Yea; James Thomas Heflin / D / Alabama / Nay; Robert B. Howell / R / Nebraska / Yea; Hiram Johnson / R / California / Yea; Magnus Johnson / F–L / Minnesota / Nay; Andrieus A. Jones / D / New Mexico / Yea; Wesley Livsey Jones / R / Washington / Yea; John B. Kendrick / D / Wyoming / Yea; Henry W. Keyes / R / New Hampshire / Yea; William H. King / D / Utah / Not voting; Robert M. La Follette / R / Wisconsin / Not voting; Edwin F. Ladd / R / North Dakota / Yea; Irvine Lenroot / R / Wisconsin / Not voting; Earle Bradford Mayfield / D / Texas / Yea; Medill McCormick / R / Illinois / Not voting; Kenneth McKeller / D / Tennessee / Yea; William B. McKinley / R / Illinois / Yea; George P. McLean / R / Connecticut / Yea; Charles L. McNary / R / Oregon / Yea; Rice W. Means / R / Colorado / Yea; Jesse H. Metcalf / R / Rhode Island / Yea; George H. Moses / R / New Hampshire / Not voting; Matthew M. Neely / D / West Virginia / Yea; Peter Norbeck / R / South Dakota / Yea; George W. Norris / R / Nebraska / Nay; Tasker Oddie / R / Nevada / Yea; Lee Slater Overman / D / North Carolina / Yea; Robert Latham Owen / D / Oklahoma / Not voting; George W. Pepper / R / Pennsylvania / Yea; Lawrence C. Phipps / R / Colorado / Yea; Key Pittman / D / Nevada / Not voting; Samuel M. Ralston / D / Indiana / Not voting; Joseph E. Ransdell / D / Louisiana / Yea; David A. Reed / R / Pennsylvania / Yea; James Reed / D / Missouri / Yea; Joseph Taylor Robinson / D / Arkansas / Yea; Morris Sheppard / D / Texas / Yea; John K. Shields / D / Tennessee / Yea; Henrik Shipstead / F–L / Minnesota / Nay; Samuel M. Shortridge / R / California / Yea; Furnifold McLendel Simmons / D / North Carolina / Yea; Ellison D. Smith / D / South Carolina / Yea; Reed Smoot / R / Utah / Yea; Selden P. Spencer / R / Missouri / Not voting; Robert Stanfield / R / Oregon / Yea; Augustus Owsley Stanley / D / Kentucky / Yea; Hubert D. Stephens / D / Mississippi / Not voting; Thomas Sterling / R / South Dakota / Yea; Claude A. Swanson / D / Virginia / Yea; Park Trammell / D / Florida / Nay; Oscar Underwood / D / Alabama / Not voting; James Wolcott Wadsworth Jr. / R / New York / Yea; David I. Walsh / D / Massachusetts / Yea; Thomas J. Walsh / D / Montana / Not voting; Francis E. Warren / R / Wyoming / Yea; James Eli Watson / R / Indiana / Yea; Ovington Weller / R / Maryland / Yea; Burton K. Wheeler / D / Montana / Not voting; Frank B. Willis / R / Ohio / Yea; Source:

== 1941 nomination for chief justice ==
Harlan Stone 1941 Supreme Court nomination
- Nominee: Harlan F. Stone (associate justice)
- Nominated by: Franklin D. Roosevelt (president of the United States)
- Succeeding: Charles Evans Hughes (chief justice)
- Outcome: Approved by the Senate

Senate Judiciary Committee vote
- Result: Reported favorably

Senate confirmation vote
- Result: Confirmed by voice vote

In 1941, President Franklin D. Roosevelt successfully nominated Harlan F. Stone to be elevated from associate justice to chief justice, succeeding the retiring Charles Evans Hughes. Chief Hughes had started to consider retiring from the court in 1940, partially due to the declining health of his wife. In June 1941, Hughes informed Roosevelt of his impending retirement, and recommended that Roosevelt elevate Stone to be his successor as chief justice. Roosevelt accepted this suggestion. Stone's support for the New Deal had earned him favor from President Franklin D. Roosevelt. On June 12, 1941, President Roosevelt nominated Stone for chief justice,

After it held a single hearing on Stone's nomination on June 21, 1941, the Senate Judiciary Committee gave his nomination a favorable recommendation on June 23, 1941. Stone was confirmed by a voice vote in the Senate on June 27, 1941, and received his commission on July 3, 1941.

== See also ==
- Calvin Coolidge Supreme Court candidates
- List of federal judges appointed by Calvin Coolidge
- Franklin D. Roosevelt Supreme Court candidates
- List of federal judges appointed by Franklin D. Roosevelt
- List of nominations to the Supreme Court of the United States
