= Closed session of the United States Congress =

Parliamentary procedure

In the Congress of the United States, a closed session (formally a session with closed doors) is a parliamentary procedure for the Senate or the House of Representatives to discuss matters requiring secrecy.

The discussions which take place in a closed session are subject to confidentiality rules and are similar to an executive session, which itself can be open or closed. An executive session is for business which includes the President of the United States.

== Senate ==
The United States Senate has been called into closed session 54 times since 1929.

Under the Standing Rules of the Senate, a closed session may be called by any senator through a simple motion. Once the motion is seconded, the presiding officer of the Senate directs the Capitol Police to clear the public galleries of spectators and close all doors of the chamber. The Senate floor will be cleared of all persons except the senators and listed parliamentary officers, including the Secretary, the Sergeant at Arms, the Parliamentarian, and certain clerks. These officers are sworn to secrecy. All sitting senators present are called to the floor, and they must surrender any electronic communications equipment including mobile phones and other electronic devices.

All business is considered secret, including senatorial remarks, votes, and other parliamentary proceedings. The Senate can vote during the session or later to lift the secrecy, at which time the vote and the session proceedings will be published in the Congressional Record.

If a senator discloses any of the proceedings except as directed by the Senate, the body can vote for expulsion of the member; any officer that does the same would be subject to dismissal. In extreme cases, the Senate could vote the member or official in contempt of Congress.

== House of Representatives ==
Like the Senate, the House of Representatives may be called into closed session by any Representative through a simple motion and a second. The United States House of Representatives has met in closed session six times since 1825. The most recent closed session was held on 13 March 2008 to discuss classified details of the Foreign Intelligence Surveillance Program during debate on the Foreign Intelligence Surveillance Act of 1978 Amendments Act of 2008.
