= List of confirmation votes for the Supreme Court of the United States =

With the exception of temporary recess appointments, in order for a Justice to be appointed to the United States Supreme Court, they must be approved by a vote of the United States Senate after being nominated by the president of the United States Senate. Not all nominees put forward by presidents have advanced to confirmation votes.

== General overview of the history of Supreme Court confirmation votes ==
Article II, Section 2, Clause 2 of the United States Constitution, known as the Appointments Clause, empowers the President of the United States to nominate and, with the confirmation (advice and consent) of the United States Senate, appoint public officials, including justices of the Supreme Court. The president has the plenary power to nominate and to appoint, while the Senate possesses the plenary power to reject or confirm the nominee prior to their appointment.

Of the 163 nominations that presidents have submitted for the court, 137 have progressed to a full-Senate vote. 126 were confirmed by the Senate, while 11 were rejected. Of the 126 nominees that were confirmed, 119 served (seven of those who were confirmed declined to serve, while one died before taking office).

The last nomination confirmed by a voice vote was that of Abe Fortas on August 11, 1965. The last time a roll call vote on a nomination was unanimous was that of Anthony Kennedy on February 3, 1988.

The first of the eleven roll call votes to result in a rejection of a nomination was the December 15, 1795 vote on the nomination of John Rutledge for chief justice, and the most recent time was the October 23, 1987 vote on the nomination of Robert Bork.

In March 1917, the procedure of a cloture vote was introduced to the Standing Rules of the United States Senate as a means of ending debate and proceeding to a vote. Until 1975, cloture required the support threshold of two-thirds of senators present and voting. From 1975 until 2017, the threshold needed to invoke cloture for Supreme Court confirmation was three-fifths of all senators duly chosen and sworn in (60 senators, if there was no more than one seat left vacant). On April 6, 2017, when considering the nomination of Neil Gorsuch, in a party-line vote the Republican Senate majority invoked the so-called "nuclear option", voting to reinterpret Senate Rule XXII and change the cloture vote threshold for Supreme Court nominations to a simple majority of senators present and voting.

== List of confirmation votes ==
=== Votes before and during the First Party System: 1789–1823 ===
Nominee	Nominated by		Succession	Confirmation vote											Cite
Nominee	President	Party of President	Preceding justice	Date of vote	Outcome	"Yea" votes		"Nay" votes		Majority party	Vote by party				Cite
Nominee	President	Party of President	Preceding justice	Date of vote	Outcome	Total	%	Total	%	Majority party	Federalist		Democratic-Republican		Cite
Nominee	President	Party of President	Preceding justice	Date of vote	Outcome	Total	%	Total	%	Majority party	Total yeas	Total nays	Total yeas	Total nays	Cite
Nominee	John Jay	Washington	None	Inaugural (chief justice)	September 26, 1789	Confirmed	Voice vote				Pro Admin	—N/a	—N/a	—N/a	—N/a
John Rutledge	Inaugural	Washington	None	September 26, 1789	Confirmed	Voice vote				—N/a	Pro Admin	—N/a	—N/a	—N/a	
William Cushing	Inaugural	Washington	None	September 26, 1789	Confirmed	Voice vote				—N/a	Pro Admin	—N/a	—N/a	—N/a	
James Wilson	Inaugural	Washington	None	September 26, 1789	Confirmed	Voice vote				—N/a	Pro Admin	—N/a	—N/a	—N/a	
John Blair Jr.	Inaugural	Washington	None	September 26, 1789	Confirmed	Voice vote				—N/a	Pro Admin	—N/a	—N/a	—N/a	
Robert H. Harrison	Inaugural	Washington	None	September 26, 1789	Confirmed (Note: Declined to serve.)	Voice vote				—N/a	Pro Admin	—N/a	—N/a	—N/a	
James Iredell	Inaugural	Washington	None	February 8, 1790	Confirmed	Voice vote				—N/a	Pro Admin	—N/a	—N/a	—N/a	
Thomas Johnson (Note: Nominee was serving on the Court under a recess appointment when the nomination was made.)	J. Rutledge	Washington	None	November 7, 1791	Confirmed	Voice vote				—N/a	Pro Admin	—N/a	—N/a	—N/a	
William Paterson	T. Johnson	Washington	None	March 4, 1793	Confirmed	Voice vote				—N/a	Pro Admin	—N/a	—N/a	—N/a	
John Rutledge	Jay (chief justice)	Washington	None	December 15, 1795	Rejected (Note: This was the first Supreme Court nomination to be rejected by the United States Senate. Rutledge remains the only "recess appointed" justice not to be subsequently confirmed by the Senate.)	10	41.67%	14	58.33%	Federalist	1	14	7	0	
William Cushing (Note: Incumbent associate justice nominated for chief justice. Such appointments are subject to a separate confirmation process.)	Rutledge (chief justice)	Washington	None	January 27, 1796	Confirmed (Note: Declined and continued to serve as an associate justice.)	Voice vote				Federalist	—N/a	—N/a	—N/a	—N/a	
Samuel Chase	Blair	Washington	None	January 27, 1796	Confirmed	Voice vote				Federalist	—N/a	—N/a	—N/a	—N/a	
Oliver Ellsworth	Rutledge (chief justice)	Washington	None	March 4, 1796	Confirmed	21	95.46%	1	4.55%	Federalist					
Bushrod Washington	J. Adams	Federalist	Wilson	December 20, 1798	Confirmed	Voice vote				Federalist	—N/a	—N/a	—N/a	—N/a	
Alfred Moore	J. Adams	Federalist	Iredell	December 20, 1799	Confirmed	Voice vote				Federalist	—N/a	—N/a	—N/a	—N/a	
John Jay	J. Adams	Federalist	Ellsworth (chief justice)	December 19, 1800	Confirmed	Voice vote				Federalist	—N/a	—N/a	—N/a	—N/a	
John Marshall	J. Adams	Federalist	Ellsworth (chief justice)	January 27, 1801	Confirmed	Voice vote				Federalist	—N/a	—N/a	—N/a	—N/a	
William Johnson	Jefferson	Democratic-Republican	Moore	March 24, 1804	Confirmed	Voice vote				Democratic-Republican	—N/a	—N/a	—N/a	—N/a	
Henry B. Livingston	Jefferson	Democratic-Republican	Paterson	December 17, 1806	Confirmed	Voice vote				Democratic-Republican	—N/a	—N/a	—N/a	—N/a	
Thomas Todd	Jefferson	Democratic-Republican	New seat	March 2, 1807	Confirmed	Voice vote				Democratic-Republican	—N/a	—N/a	—N/a	—N/a	
Levi Lincoln Sr.	Madison	Democratic-Republican	W. Cushing	January 3, 1811	Confirmed	Voice vote				Democratic-Republican	—N/a	—N/a	—N/a	—N/a	
Alexander Wolcott	Madison	Democratic-Republican	W. Cushing	February 4, 1811	Rejected	9	27.27%	24	72.73%	Democratic-Republican					
John Quincy Adams	Madison	Democratic-Republican	W. Cushing	February 22, 1811	Confirmed	Voice vote				Democratic-Republican	—N/a	—N/a	—N/a	—N/a	
Joseph Story	Madison	Democratic-Republican	W. Cushing	November 18, 1811	Confirmed	Voice vote				Democratic-Republican	—N/a	—N/a	—N/a	—N/a	
Gabriel Duvall	Madison	Democratic-Republican	S. Chase	November 18, 1811	Confirmed	Voice vote				Democratic-Republican	—N/a	—N/a	—N/a	—N/a	
Smith Thompson	Monroe	Democratic-Republican	Livingston	December 9, 1823	Confirmed	Voice vote				Democratic-Republican	—N/a	—N/a	—N/a	—N/a	
General sources:

=== Votes during the Jacksonian–National Republican era: 1826–1836 ===
Nominee	Nominated by		Succession	Confirmation vote													Cite
Nominee	President	Party of President	Preceding justice	Date of vote	Outcome	"Yea" votes		"Nay" votes		Majority party	Vote by party						Cite
Nominee	President	Party of President	Preceding justice	Date of vote	Outcome	Total	%	Total	%	Majority party	Jacksonian		National Republican		Nullifier		Cite
Nominee	President	Party of President	Preceding justice	Date of vote	Outcome	Total	%	Total	%	Majority party	Total yeas	Total nays	Total yeas	Total nays	Total yeas	Total nays	Cite
Nominee	Robert Trimble	J. Q. Adams	National; Republican	Todd	May 9, 1826	Confirmed	27	84.38%	5	15.63%	Jacksonian (Note: The political allies of Andrew Jackson and William H. Crawford held a majority in the Senate over the allies of John Quincy Adams and Henry Clay throughout Adams' presidency.)	12	5	15	0	—	—
John McLean	Jackson	Jacksonian	Trimble	March 7, 1829	Confirmed	Voice vote				Jacksonian	—N/a	—N/a	—N/a	—N/a	—N/a	—N/a	
Henry Baldwin	Jackson	Jacksonian	Washington	January 4, 1830	Confirmed	41	95.35%	2	4.65%	Jacksonian	20	1	21	0	0	1	
James Moore Wayne	Jackson	Jacksonian	W. Johnson	January 9, 1835	Confirmed	Voice vote				National Republican	—N/a	—N/a	—N/a	—N/a	—N/a	—N/a	
Roger B. Taney	Jackson	Jacksonian	Marshall (chief justice)	March 15, 1836	Confirmed	29	65.91%	15	34.09%	Jacksonian	24	0	5	13	0	2	
Philip P. Barbour	Jackson	Jacksonian	Duvall	March 15, 1836	Confirmed	30	73.17%	11	26.83%	Jacksonian	24	0	5	11	1	0	
General sources:														11			

=== Votes during the Second Party System: 1836–1853 ===
Nominee	Nominated by		Succession	Confirmation vote											Cite
Nominee	President	Party of President	Preceding justice	Date of vote	Outcome	"Yea" votes		"Nay" votes		Majority party	Vote by party				Cite
Nominee	President	Party of President	Preceding justice	Date of vote	Outcome	Total	%	Total	%	Majority party	Democratic		Whig		Cite
Nominee	President	Party of President	Preceding justice	Date of vote	Outcome	Total	%	Total	%	Majority party	Total yeas	Total nays	Total yeas	Total nays	Cite
Nominee	John Catron	Jackson	Democratic	new seat	March 8, 1837	Confirmed	28	65.12%	15	34.88%	Democratic	26	2	2	13
William Smith	new seat	Jackson	Democratic	March 8, 1837	Confirmed	23	56.10%	18	43.90%	23	Democratic	3	0	15	
John McKinley	Van Buren	new seat	Democratic	September 25, 1837	Confirmed	Voice vote				—N/a	Democratic	—N/a	—N/a	—N/a	
Peter V. Daniel	Van Buren	Barbour	Democratic	March 2, 1841	Confirmed	25	83.33%	5	16.67%	24	Democratic	4	0	1	
John Canfield Spencer	Tyler	None	Thompson	January 31, 1844	Rejected	21	44.68%	26	55.32%	Whig	16	5	5	21	
Samuel Nelson	Tyler	None	Thompson	February 14, 1845	Confirmed	Voice vote				Whig	—N/a	—N/a	—N/a	—N/a	
George Washington Woodward	Polk	Democratic	Baldwin	January 22, 1846	Rejected	20	40.82%	29	59.18%	Democratic					
Levi Woodbury	Polk	Democratic	Story	January 3, 1846	Confirmed	Voice vote				Democratic	—N/a	—N/a	—N/a	—N/a	
Robert Cooper Grier	Polk	Democratic	Baldwin	August 4, 1846	Confirmed	Voice vote				Democratic	—N/a	—N/a	—N/a	—N/a	
Benjamin Robbins Curtis	Fillmore	Whig	Baldwin	December 23, 1851	Confirmed	Voice vote				Democratic	—N/a	—N/a	—N/a	—N/a	
John Archibald Campbell	Pierce	Democratic Party	McKinley	March 22, 1853	Confirmed	Voice vote				Democratic	—N/a	—N/a	—N/a	—N/a	
General sources:

=== Votes during the Third Party System: 1857–present ===
Nominee	Nominated by		Succession	Confirmation vote														Cite
Nominee	President	Party of President	Preceding justice	Date of vote	Outcome	"Yea" votes		"Nay" votes		Majority party	Vote by party							Cite
Nominee	President	Party of President	Preceding justice	Date of vote	Outcome	Total	%	Total	%	Majority party	Democratic		Republican		Other Parties			Cite
Nominee	President	Party of President	Preceding justice	Date of vote	Outcome	Total	%	Total	%	Majority party	Total yeas	Total nays	Total yeas	Total nays	Party name	Total yeas	Total nays	Cite
Nominee	Nathan Clifford	Buchanan	Democratic	Curtis	January 12, 1858	Confirmed	26	53.06%	23	46.94%	Democratic	25	3	0	18	Know Nothing	1	2
Samuel Freeman Miller	Lincoln	Republican	Daniel	January 16, 1862	Confirmed	Voice vote				Republican	—N/a	—N/a	—N/a	—N/a	—N/a	—N/a	—N/a	
Noah Haynes Swayne	Lincoln	Republican	McLean	January 24, 1862	Confirmed	38	97.44%	1	2.56%	Republican	8	0	27	1	Union	3	0	
David Davis	Lincoln	Republican	Campbell	December 8, 1862	Confirmed	Voice vote				Republican	—N/a	—N/a	—N/a	—N/a	—N/a	—N/a	—N/a	
Stephen Johnson Field	Lincoln	Republican	new seat	March 10, 1863	Confirmed	Voice vote				Republican	—N/a	—N/a	—N/a	—N/a	—N/a	—N/a	—N/a	
Salmon P. Chase	Lincoln	Republican	Taney (chief justice)	December 6, 1864	Confirmed	Voice vote				Republican	—N/a	—N/a	—N/a	—N/a	—N/a	—N/a	—N/a	
Edwin Stanton	Grant	Republican	Grier	December 20, 1869	Confirmed (Note: Died prior to becoming a member of the Court.)	46	80.70%	11	19.30%	Republican	0	9	46	3	—	—	—	
Ebenezer R. Hoar	Grant	Republican	new seat	February 3, 1870	Rejected	24	42.11%	33	57.90%	Republican	0	9	24	24	—	—	—	
William Strong	Grant	Republican	Grier	February 18, 1870	Confirmed	Voice vote				Republican	—N/a	—N/a	—N/a	—N/a	—N/a	—N/a	—N/a	
Joseph P. Bradley	Grant	Republican	new seat	March 21, 1870	Confirmed	46	83.64%	9	16.36%	Republican	9	0	37	9	—	—	—	
Ward Hunt	Grant	Republican	Nelson	December 11, 1872	Confirmed	Voice vote				Republican	—N/a	—N/a	—N/a	—N/a	—N/a	—N/a	—N/a	
Morrison Waite	Grant	Republican	S. P. Chase (chief justice)	January 21, 1874	Confirmed	63	100%	0	0%	Republican	15	0	33	0	Liberal Republican	5	0	
John Marshall Harlan	Hayes	Republican	Davis	November 29, 1877	Confirmed	Voice vote				Republican	—N/a	—N/a	—N/a	—N/a	—N/a	—N/a	—N/a	
William Burnham Woods	Hayes	Republican	Strong	December 21, 1880	Confirmed	39	82.98%	8	17.02%	Democratic	14	8	24	0	Independents	1	0	
Stanley Matthews	Garfield	Republican	Swayne	May 12, 1881	Confirmed	24	51.06%	23	48.94%	Split								
Horace Gray	Arthur	Republican	Clifford	December 20, 1881	Confirmed	51	91.07%	5	8.93%	Split	21	5	29	0	Independents	1	0	
Roscoe Conkling	Arthur	Republican	Hunt	March 2, 1882	Confirmed	39	76.47%	12	23.53%	Split								
Samuel Blatchford	Arthur	Republican	Hunt	March 2, 1882	Confirmed	Voice vote				Split	—N/a	—N/a	—N/a	—N/a	—N/a	—N/a	—N/a	
Lucius Quintus Cincinnatus Lamar	Cleveland	Democratic	Woods	January 16, 1888	Confirmed	32	53.33%	28	46.67%	Republican								
Melville Fuller	Cleveland	Democratic	Waite (chief justice)	July 20, 1888	Confirmed	41	67.21%	20	32.79%	Republican								
David J. Brewer	B. Harrison	Republican	Matthews	December 18, 1889	Confirmed	53	82.81%	11	17.19%	Republican	18	4	35	7	—	—	—	
Henry Billings Brown	B. Harrison	Republican	Miller	December 29, 1890	Confirmed	Voice vote				Republican	—N/a	—N/a	—N/a	—N/a	—N/a	—N/a	—N/a	
George Shiras Jr.	B. Harrison	Republican	Bradley	July 26, 1892	Confirmed	Voice vote				Republican	—N/a	—N/a	—N/a	—N/a	—N/a	—N/a	—N/a	
Howell Edmunds Jackson	B. Harrison	Republican	L. Lamar	February 18, 1893	Confirmed	Voice vote				Republican	—N/a	—N/a	—N/a	—N/a	—N/a	—N/a	—N/a	
William B. Hornblower	Cleveland	Democratic	Blatchford	January 15, 1894	Rejected	24	44.44%	30	55.56%	Democratic								
Wheeler Hazard Peckham	Cleveland	Democratic	Blatchford	February 16, 1894	Rejected	32	43.84%	41	56.16%	Democratic								
Edward Douglas White	Cleveland	Democratic	Blatchford	February 19, 1894	Confirmed	Voice vote				Democratic	—N/a	—N/a	—N/a	—N/a	—N/a	—N/a	—N/a	
Rufus W. Peckham	Cleveland	Democratic	H. Jackson	December 9, 1895	Confirmed	Voice vote				Republican	—N/a	—N/a	—N/a	—N/a	—N/a	—N/a	—N/a	
Joseph McKenna	McKinley	Republican	Field	January 21, 1898	Confirmed	Voice vote				Republican	—N/a	—N/a	—N/a	—N/a	—N/a	—N/a	—N/a	
Oliver Wendell Holmes Jr.	T. Roosevelt	Republican	Gray	December 4, 1902	Confirmed	Voice vote				Republican	—N/a	—N/a	—N/a	—N/a	—N/a	—N/a	—N/a	
William R. Day	T. Roosevelt	Republican	Shiras	February 23, 1903	Confirmed	Voice vote				Republican	—N/a	—N/a	—N/a	—N/a	—N/a	—N/a	—N/a	
William Henry Moody	T. Roosevelt	Republican	Brown	December 12, 1906	Confirmed	Voice vote				Republican	—N/a	—N/a	—N/a	—N/a	—N/a	—N/a	—N/a	
Horace Harmon Lurton	Taft	Republican	R. Peckham	December 20, 1909	Confirmed	Voice vote				Republican	—N/a	—N/a	—N/a	—N/a	—N/a	—N/a	—N/a	
Charles Evans Hughes	Taft	Republican	R. Peckham	May 2, 1910	Confirmed	Voice vote				Republican	—N/a	—N/a	—N/a	—N/a	—N/a	—N/a	—N/a	
Edward Douglas White	Taft	Republican	Fuller (chief justice)	December 12, 1910	Confirmed	Voice vote				Republican	—N/a	—N/a	—N/a	—N/a	—N/a	—N/a	—N/a	
Willis Van Devanter	Taft	Republican	E. D. White	December 15, 1910	Confirmed	Voice vote				Republican	—N/a	—N/a	—N/a	—N/a	—N/a	—N/a	—N/a	
Joseph Rucker Lamar	Taft	Republican	Moody	December 15, 1910	Confirmed	Voice vote				Republican	—N/a	—N/a	—N/a	—N/a	—N/a	—N/a	—N/a	
Mahlon Pitney	Taft	Republican	J. Harlan	March 12, 1912	Confirmed	50	65.79%	26	34.21%	Republican								
James Clark McReynolds	Wilson	Democratic	Lurton	August 29, 1914	Confirmed	50	65.79%	26	34.21%	Democratic					Progressive			
Louis Brandeis	Wilson	Democratic	J. Lamar	June 1, 1916	Confirmed	47	68.12%	22	31.88%	Democratic	44	1	3	21	—	—	—	
John Hessin Clarke	Wilson	Democratic	Hughes	July 14, 1916	Confirmed	Voice vote				Democratic	—N/a	—N/a	—N/a	—N/a	—N/a	—N/a	—N/a	
William Howard Taft	Harding	Republican	E. D. White	June 30, 1921	Confirmed	Voice vote				Republican	—N/a	—N/a	—N/a	—N/a	—N/a	—N/a	—N/a	
George Sutherland	Harding	Republican	Clarke	September 5, 1922	Confirmed	Voice vote				Republican	—N/a	—N/a	—N/a	—N/a	—N/a	—N/a	—N/a	
Pierce Butler	Harding	Republican	Day	December 5, 1922	Confirmed	61	88.41%	8	11.59%	Republican	21	5	40	3	—	—	—	
Edward Terry Sanford	Harding	Republican	Pitney	January 29, 1923	Confirmed	Voice vote				Republican	—N/a	—N/a	—N/a	—N/a	—N/a	—N/a	—N/a	
Harlan F. Stone	Coolidge	Republican	McKenna	January 5, 1925	Confirmed	71	92.21%	6	7.78%	Republican	27	2	44	2	Farmer-Labor	0	2	
Charles Evans Hughes	Hoover	Republican	Taft (chief justice)	February 13, 1930	Confirmed	52	66.67%	26	33.33%	Republican	14	15	38	11	Farmer-Labor	0	0	
John J. Parker	Hoover	Republican	Sanford	May 7, 1930	Rejected	39	48.75%	41	51.25%	Republican	10	23	29	17	Farmer-Labor	0	1	
Owen Roberts	Hoover	Republican	Sanford	May 20, 1930	Confirmed	Voice vote				Republican	—N/a	—N/a	—N/a	—N/a	—N/a	—N/a	—N/a	
Benjamin N. Cardozo	Hoover	Republican	Holmes	February 15, 1932	Confirmed	Voice vote				Republican	—N/a	—N/a	—N/a	—N/a	—N/a	—N/a	—N/a	
Hugo Black	F. D. Roosevelt	Democratic	Van Devanter	August 17, 1937	Confirmed	63	79.75%	16	20.25%	Democratic	57	6	4	10	Farmer-Labor	1	0	
Hugo Black	F. D. Roosevelt	Democratic	Van Devanter	August 17, 1937	Confirmed	63	79.75%	16	20.25%	Democratic	57	6	4	10	Wisconsin Progressive	1	0	
Hugo Black	F. D. Roosevelt	Democratic	Van Devanter	August 17, 1937	Confirmed	63	79.75%	16	20.25%	Democratic	57	6	4	10	Independents	0	0	
Stanley Forman Reed	F. D. Roosevelt	Democratic	Sutherland	January 15, 1938	Confirmed	Voice vote				Democratic	—N/a	—N/a	—N/a	—N/a	—N/a	—N/a	—N/a	
Felix Frankfurter	F. D. Roosevelt	Democratic	Cardozo	January 5, 1939	Confirmed	Voice vote				Democratic	—N/a	—N/a	—N/a	—N/a	—N/a	—N/a	—N/a	
William O. Douglas	F. D. Roosevelt	Democratic	Brandeis	March 20, 1939	Confirmed	62	93.94%	4	6.06%	Democratic	50	0	9	4	Farmer-Labor	1	0	
William O. Douglas	F. D. Roosevelt	Democratic	Brandeis	March 20, 1939	Confirmed	62	93.94%	4	6.06%	Democratic	50	0	9	4	Wisconsin Progressive	1	0	
William O. Douglas	F. D. Roosevelt	Democratic	Brandeis	March 20, 1939	Confirmed	62	93.94%	4	6.06%	Democratic	50	0	9	4	Independents	1	0	
Frank Murphy	F. D. Roosevelt	Democratic	Butler	January 16, 1940	Confirmed	Voice vote				Democratic	—N/a	—N/a	—N/a	—N/a	—N/a	—N/a	—N/a	
James F. Byrnes	F. D. Roosevelt	Democratic	McReynolds	June 12, 1941	Confirmed	Voice vote				Democratic	—N/a	—N/a	—N/a	—N/a	—N/a	—N/a	—N/a	
Harlan F. Stone	F. D. Roosevelt	Democratic	Hughes (chief justice)	June 27, 1941	Confirmed	Voice vote				Democratic	—N/a	—N/a	—N/a	—N/a	—N/a	—N/a	—N/a	
Robert H. Jackson	F. D. Roosevelt	Democratic	Stone	July 7, 1941	Confirmed	Voice vote				Democratic	—N/a	—N/a	—N/a	—N/a	—N/a	—N/a	—N/a	
Wiley Rutledge	F. D. Roosevelt	Democratic	Byrnes	February 8, 1943	Confirmed	Voice vote				Democratic	—N/a	—N/a	—N/a	—N/a	—N/a	—N/a	—N/a	
Harold Hitz Burton	Truman	Democratic	O. Roberts	September 19, 1945	Confirmed	Voice vote				Democratic	—N/a	—N/a	—N/a	—N/a	—N/a	—N/a	—N/a	
Fred M. Vinson	Truman	Democratic	Stone (chief justice)	June 20, 1946	Confirmed	Voice vote				Democratic	—N/a	—N/a	—N/a	—N/a	—N/a	—N/a	—N/a	
Tom C. Clark	Truman	Democratic	Murphy	August 18, 1949	Confirmed	73	90.12%	8	9.88%	Democratic	46	0	27	8	—	—	—	
Sherman Minton	Truman	Democratic	W. Rutledge	October 4, 1949	Confirmed	48	75.00%	16	25.00%	Democratic	36	2	12	14	—	—	—	
Earl Warren	Eisenhower	Republican	Vinson (chief justice)	March 1, 1954	Confirmed	Voice vote				Republican	—N/a	—N/a	—N/a	—N/a	—N/a	—N/a	—N/a	
John Marshall Harlan II	Eisenhower	Republican	R. Jackson	March 16, 1955	Confirmed	71	86.59%	11	13.42%	Democratic	32	9	39	2	Independents	0	0	
William J. Brennan Jr.	Eisenhower	Republican	Minton	March 19, 1957	Confirmed	Voice vote				Democratic	—N/a	—N/a	—N/a	—N/a	—N/a	—N/a	—N/a	
Charles Evans Whittaker	Eisenhower	Republican	Reed	March 19, 1957	Confirmed	Voice vote				Democratic	—N/a	—N/a	—N/a	—N/a	—N/a	—N/a	—N/a	
Potter Stewart	Eisenhower	Republican	Minton	May 5, 1959	Confirmed	70	80.46%	17	19.54%	Democratic	42	17	28	0	—	—	—	
Byron White	Kennedy	Democratic	Whittaker	April 11, 1962	Confirmed	Voice vote				Democratic	—N/a	—N/a	—N/a	—N/a	—N/a	—N/a	—N/a	
Arthur Goldberg	Kennedy	Democratic	Frankfurter	September 25, 1962	Confirmed	Voice vote				Democratic	—N/a	—N/a	—N/a	—N/a	—N/a	—N/a	—N/a	
Abe Fortas	L Johnson	Democratic	Goldberg	August 11, 1965	Confirmed	Voice vote				Democratic	—N/a	—N/a	—N/a	—N/a	—N/a	—N/a	—N/a	
Thurgood Marshall	L Johnson	Democratic	Clark	August 30, 1967	Confirmed	69	86.25%	11	13.75%	Democratic	37	10	32	1	—	—	—	
Warren E. Burger	Nixon	Republican	Warren (chief justice)	June 9, 1969	Confirmed	74	95.10%	3	3.90%	Democratic	38	3	36	0	—	—	—	
Clement Haynsworth	Nixon	Republican	Fortas	November 21, 1969	Rejected	45	45.00%	55	55.00%	Democratic	19	38	26	17	—	—	—	
G. Harrold Carswell	Nixon	Republican	Fortas	April 8, 1970	Rejected	45	46.88%	51	53.13%	Democratic	16	38	28	13	Independent Democrats	1	0	
Harry Blackmun	Nixon	Republican	Fortas	May 12, 1970	Confirmed	94	100%	0	0%	Democratic	53	0	40	0	Independent Democrats	1	0	
Lewis F. Powell Jr.	Nixon	Republican	H. Black	December 6, 1971	Confirmed	89	98.89%	1	1.11%	Democratic	49	1	38	0	Conservative Party of New York State	1	0	
Lewis F. Powell Jr.	Nixon	Republican	H. Black	December 6, 1971	Confirmed	89	98.89%	1	1.11%	Democratic	49	1	38	0	Independent Democrats	1	0	
William Rehnquist	Nixon	Republican	J. Harlan II	December 10, 1971	Confirmed	68	72.34%	26	27.66%	Democratic	29	23	37	3	Conservative Party of New York State	1	0	
William Rehnquist	Nixon	Republican	J. Harlan II	December 10, 1971	Confirmed	68	72.34%	26	27.66%	Democratic	29	23	37	3	Independent Democrats	1	0	
John Paul Stevens	Ford	Republican	Douglas	December 17, 1975	Confirmed	98	100%	0	0%	Democratic	59	0	37	0	Conservative Party of New York State	1	0	
John Paul Stevens	Ford	Republican	Douglas	December 17, 1975	Confirmed	98	100%	0	0%	Democratic	59	0	37	0	Independent Democrats	1	0	
Sandra Day O'Connor	Reagan	Republican	Stewart	Septemhber 21, 1981	Confirmed	99	100%	0	0%	Republican	45	0	53	0	Independent Democrats	1	0	
William Rehnquist	Reagan	Republican	Burger (chief justice)	September 17, 1986	Confirmed	65	66.33%	33	33.67%	Republican	16	31	49	2	—	—	—	
Antonin Scalia	Reagan	Republican	Rehnquist	September 17, 1986	Confirmed	98	100%	0	0%	Republican	47	0	51	0	—	—	—	
Robert Bork	Reagan	Republican	Powell	October 23, 1987	Rejected	42	42.00%	58	58.00%	Democratic	2	52	40	6	—	—	—	
Anthony Kennedy	Reagan	Republican	Powell	February 3, 1988	Confirmed	97	100%	0	0%	Democratic	51	0	46	0	—	—	—	
David Souter	G. H. W. Bush	Republican	Brennan	October 2, 1990	Confirmed	90	90.91%	9	9.09%	Democratic	46	9	44	0	—	—	—	
Clarence Thomas	G. H. W. Bush	Republican	T. Marshall	October 15, 1991	Confirmed	52	52.00%	48	48.00%	Democratic	11	46	41	2	—	—	—	
Ruth Bader Ginsburg	Clinton	Democratic	B. White	August 3, 1993	Confirmed	96	96.97%	3	3.03%	Democratic	55	0	41	3	—	—	—	
Stephen Breyer	Clinton	Democratic	Blackmun	July 29, 1994	Confirmed	87	90.63%	9	9.38%	Democratic	54	0	33	9	—	—	—	
John Roberts	G. W. Bush	Republican	Rehnquist (chief justice)	September 29, 2005	Confirmed	78	78.00%	22	22.00%	Republican	22	22	55	0	Independent Democrats	1	0	
Samuel Alito	G. W. Bush	Republican	O'Connor	January 31, 2006	Confirmed	58	58.00%	42	42.00%	Republican	4	40	54	1	Independent Democrats	0	1	
Sonia Sotomayor	Obama	Democratic	Souter	August 6, 2009	Confirmed	68	68.69%	31	31.31%	Democratic	57	0	9	31	Independent Democrats	2	0	
Elena Kagan	Obama	Democratic	Stevens	August 5, 2010	Confirmed	63	63.00%	37	37.00%	Democratic	56	1	5	36	Independent Democrats	2	0	
Neil Gorsuch	Trump	Republican	Scalia	April 7, 2017	Confirmed	54	54.55%	45	45.45%	Republican	3	43	51	0	Independent Democrats	0	2	
Brett Kavanaugh	Trump	Republican	Kennedy	October 6, 2018	Confirmed	50	51.02%	48	48.98%	Republican	1	46	49	0	Independent Democrats	0	2	
Amy Coney Barrett	Trump	Republican	Ginsburg	October 26, 2020	Confirmed	52	52.00%	48	48.00%	Republican	0	45	52	1	Independent Democrats	0	2	
Ketanji Brown Jackson	Biden	Democratic	Breyer	April 7, 2022	Confirmed	53	53.00%	47	47.00%	Democratic	48	0	3	47	Independent Democrats	2	0	
General sources:

== List of cloture votes ==
On occasion, a cloture vote has been taken in an effort to end Senate debate and allow a confirmation vote to take place.

Between the 1917 (when cloture was introduced to the Senate) and year 1975, cloture required the support threshold of two-thirds of senators present and voting. From 1975 until 2017, the threshold needed to invoke cloture for Supreme Court confirmation was three-fifths of all senators duly chosen and sworn in (60 senators, if there was no more than one seat left vacant). On April 7, 2017, the votes of Democratic senators managed to deny enough support for cloture on the nomination of Neil Gorsuch. The Senate's Republican majority used the "nuclear option" to reduce the threshold for cloture to a simple 50% majority of votes, and Gorsuch met this new cloture threshold in the subsequent reconsideration. Ever since this, the threshold has been a simple 50% majority of votes.

The first attempt to invoke cloture on a Supreme Court nomination occurred in 1968 on the nomination to elevate Associate Justice Abe Fortas to chief justice. The first cloture motion to succeed was on the 1986 nomination to elevate Associate Justice William Rehnquist to chief justice.

Nominee	Nominated by		Vote on cloture motion														Subsequent outcome	Cite	
Nominee	President	Party of President	Date of cloture motion	Outcome of cloture motion	"Yea" votes		"Nay" votes		Majority party	Vote by party							Subsequent outcome	Cite	
Nominee	President	Party of President	Date of cloture motion	Outcome of cloture motion	Total	%	Total	%	Majority party	Democratic		Republican		Other Parties			Subsequent outcome	Cite	
Nominee	President	Party of President	Date of cloture motion	Outcome of cloture motion	Total	%	Total	%	Majority party	Total yeas	Total nays	Total yeas	Total nays	Party name	Total yeas	Total nays	Subsequent outcome	Cite	
Nominee	Abe Fortas	L. Johnson	Democratic	October 1, 1968	Rejected	45	51.14%	43	48.86%	Democratic	35	19	10	24	—	—	Subsequent outcome	—	Nomination was withdrawn (Note: Nominee continued to serve as an associate justice.) on October 2, 1968
William Rehnquist	Nixon	Republican	December 10, 1971	Rejected	52	55.32%	42	44.68%		Democratic				—	—	—	Motion to postpone confirmation (until January 18, 1972) rejected (22–70) on December 10, 1971; confirmed (68–26) on December 10, 1971		
William Rehnquist	Reagan	Republican	September 17, 1986	Successfully invoked	68	68.04%	31	25.77%	Republican	16	31	52	0	—	—	—	Confirmed (65–33) on September 17, 1986		
Samuel Alito	G W Bush	Republican	January 30, 2006	Successfully invoked	72	74.23%	25	25.77%	Republican	19	24	53	0	Independent Democrats	0	1	Confirmed (58–42) on January 31, 2006		
Neil Gorsuch	Trump	Republican	April 6, 2017	Rejected	55	55.00%	45	45.00%	Republican	4	42	51	1	Independent Democrats	0	2	Confirmed (54–45) on April 7, 2017		
Neil Gorsuch	Trump	Republican	April 6, 2017	Successfully invoked upon reconsideration (under new threshold)	55	55.00%	45	45.00%	Republican	3	43	52	0	Independent Democrats	0	2	Confirmed (54–45) on April 7, 2017		
Brett Kavanaugh	Trump	Republican	October 5, 2018	Successfully invoked	51	51.00%	49	49.00%	Republican	1	46	50	1	Independent Democrats	0	2	Confirmed (50–48) on October 6, 2018		
Amy Coney Barrett	Trump	Republican	October 25, 2020	Successfully invoked	51	51.00%	48	48.00%	Republican	0	44	51	2	Independent Democrats	0	2	Confirmed (52–48) on October 26, 2020		
Ketanji Brown Jackson	Biden	Democratic	April 7, 2022	Successfully invoked	53	53.00%	47	47.00%	Democratic	48	0	3	47	Independent Democrats	2	0	Confirmed (53–47) on April 7, 2022		
General sources:		Democratic																	

== See also ==
- Nomination and confirmation to the Supreme Court of the United States
- List of nominations to the Supreme Court of the United States
- Unsuccessful nominations to the Supreme Court of the United States
- Senate Judiciary Committee reviews of nominations to the Supreme Court of the United States
