= List of nominations to the Supreme Court of the United States =

Persons nominated to the Supreme Court of the United States

The Supreme Court of the United States is the highest ranking judicial body in the United States. Established by Article III of the Constitution, the Court was organized by the 1st United States Congress through the Judiciary Act of 1789, which specified its original and appellate jurisdiction, created 13 judicial districts, and fixed the size of the Supreme Court at six, with one chief justice and five associate justices. During the 19th century, Congress changed the size of the Court on seven occasions, concluding with the Judiciary Act of 1869 which stipulates that the Court consists of the chief justice and eight associate justices.

Article II, Section 2, Clause 2 of the Constitution grants plenary power to the president of the United States to nominate, and with the advice and consent (confirmation) of the United States Senate, appoint justices to the Supreme Court. Nominations to the Supreme Court are considered to be official when the Senate receives a signed nomination letter from the president naming the nominee, which is then entered in the Senate's record. Since 1789, there have been 165 formal nominations (of 146 persons) to the Supreme Court; 128 of them (123 persons) have been confirmed. The most recent nomination to be confirmed was that of Ketanji Brown Jackson in 2022. Of the 37 that were unsuccessful, 11 nominees were rejected in Senate roll-call votes, 12 were withdrawn by the president, and 14 lapsed at the end of a session of Congress. Six of these unsuccessful nominees were subsequently nominated and confirmed to other seats on the Court. Additionally, although confirmed, seven nominees either declined office or (in one instance) died before assuming office.

An important role in this process is played by the Senate Judiciary Committee, which conducts a comprehensive evaluation of a nominee's background and qualifications before the Senate considers the nomination. Once confirmed to a seat on the Court, justices are appointed by the president by commission. Justices have life tenure, and so they serve until they die in office, resign or retire, or are impeached and removed from office. As it requires a separate presidential appointment, an incumbent associate justice who is nominated to be chief justice must undergo the confirmation process again.

On rare occasions, presidents have made Supreme Court appointments without the Senate's consent, when the Senate is in recess. Such "recess appointments", however, are temporary, expiring at the end of the Senate's next session. Presidents have made recess appointments on 12 occasions, most recently in 1958. Every recess appointed justice was later nominated to the same position, and all but one—John Rutledge in 1795 to be chief justice—was confirmed by the Senate. The 1795 Rutledge nomination was the first Supreme Court nomination to be rejected by the Senate; the most recent nomination to be voted down was that of Robert Bork in 1987. George Washington holds the record for most Supreme Court nominations, with 14 nominations (12 of which were confirmed). Three presidents—William Henry Harrison, Zachary Taylor, and Jimmy Carter—did not make any nominations, as there were no vacancies while they were in office, while one president, Andrew Johnson, did not make any successful nominations, as Congress decided to reduce the size of the Supreme Court rather than consider his nominee to fill a vacancy.

== Summary of table ==
The table below lists all persons nominated for a seat on the Supreme Court since 1789, in chronological order by date of nomination, along with the actions taken by the president and the Senate on those nominations. Specifically, the table lists the following for each Supreme Court nomination:

- name of each nominee;
- name of the president who made the nomination, and their political party affiliation;
- name of the justice whose departure created the vacancy (the column sorts so as to show the person-to-person succession of judges since 1789);
- majority party in the Senate at the time of the nomination;
- date on which the president formally made the nomination, by signing a nomination message;
- outcome, the type and date of final action by the Senate, or of a nomination's withdrawal by the president;
- number of days that elapsed from the date a nomination was formally submitted until the date of final Senate action or the nomination's withdrawal.

The following final results of the nomination process are tracked:

1. confirmed – nominations confirmed by the Senate (including those of persons who subsequently declined to serve, or who died before taking office);
2. withdrawn – nominations withdrawn by the president prior to a confirmation vote;
3. rejected – nominations rejected by the Senate;
4. lapsed – nominations that lapsed at the end of a session of Congress without a Senate vote cast on whether to confirm (including nominations that were postponed or tabled by the Senate that were not given further consideration).

Additionally, where the final Senate action on a nomination was a roll-call vote (as opposed to a voice vote or unanimous consent), the totals for and against are noted.

In listing all persons ever nominated to the Supreme Court, the table includes the names of those who were not confirmed as well as those who were confirmed but did not assume office. For a list solely of the 115 individuals who assumed office and served on the Court, see List of justices of the Supreme Court of the United States. Not included in the table are intended nominees, announced presidential selections whose names were withdrawn prior to being formally submitted to the Senate, (Note: Such as Ronald Reagan's October 1987 selection of Douglas H. Ginsburg to be associate justice in the aftermath of the Senate's rejection of the nomination of Robert Bork, which was withdrawn before being conveyed to the Senate.) as such persons were never officially nominated to the Court.

== Nominations ==
Nominations to the Supreme Court of the United States since 1789
Nominee	Nominated by		Succession	Nomination			
Name	President	Party	Justice	Senate majority party	Date submitted	Outcome (vote) and date	No. of days
John Jay	Washington	None	Inaugural	Pro Admin	Sep. 24, 1789	confirmed Sep. 26, 1789	2
John Rutledge	Washington	None	Inaugural	Pro Admin	Sep. 24, 1789	confirmed Sep. 26, 1789	2
William Cushing	Washington	None	Inaugural	Pro Admin	Sep. 24, 1789	confirmed Sep. 26, 1789	2
Robert H. Harrison	Washington	None	Inaugural	Pro Admin	Sep. 24, 1789	confirmed (Note: Declined to serve.); Sep. 26, 1789	2
James Wilson	Washington	None	Inaugural	Pro Admin	Sep. 24, 1789	confirmed Sep. 26, 1789	2
John Blair Jr.	Washington	None	Inaugural	Pro Admin	Sep. 24, 1789	confirmed Sep. 26, 1789	2
James Iredell	Washington	None	Inaugural	Pro Admin	Feb. 8, 1790	confirmed Feb. 10, 1790	2
Thomas Johnson (Note: Nominee was serving on the Court under a recess appointment when the nomination was made.)	Washington	None	J. Rutledge	Pro Admin	Oct. 31, 1791	confirmed Nov. 7, 1791	7
William Paterson	Washington	None	T. Johnson	Pro Admin	Feb. 27, 1793	withdrawn Feb. 28, 1793	1
William Paterson	Washington	None	T. Johnson	Pro Admin	Mar. 4, 1793	confirmed Mar. 4, 1793	0
John Rutledge	Washington	None	Jay	Federalist	Dec. 10, 1795	rejected (10–14); Dec. 15, 1795	5
William Cushing (Note: Incumbent associate justice nominated for chief justice. Such appointments are subject to a separate confirmation process.)	Washington	None	Rutledge	Federalist	Jan. 26, 1796	confirmed (Note: Declined and continued to serve as an associate justice.); Jan. 27, 1796	1
Samuel Chase	Washington	None	Blair	Federalist	Jan. 26, 1796	confirmed Jan. 27, 1796	1
Oliver Ellsworth	Washington	None	Rutledge	Federalist	Mar. 3, 1796	confirmed (21–1); Mar. 4, 1796	1
Bushrod Washington	J. Adams	Federalist	Wilson	Federalist	Dec. 19, 1798	confirmed Dec. 20, 1798	1
Alfred Moore	J. Adams	Federalist	Iredell	Federalist	Dec. 4, 1799	confirmed Dec. 10, 1799	6
John Jay	J. Adams	Federalist	Ellsworth	Federalist	Dec. 18, 1800	confirmed Dec. 19, 1800	1
John Marshall	J. Adams	Federalist	Ellsworth	Federalist	Jan. 20, 1801	confirmed Jan. 27, 1801	7
William Johnson	Jefferson	Dem-Rep	Moore	Dem-Rep	Mar. 22, 1804	confirmed Mar. 24, 1804	2
Henry B. Livingston	Jefferson	Dem-Rep	Paterson	Dem-Rep	Dec. 13, 1806	confirmed Dec. 17, 1806	4
Thomas Todd	Jefferson	Dem-Rep	new seat	Dem-Rep	Feb. 28, 1807	confirmed Mar. 2, 1807	2
Levi Lincoln Sr.	Madison	Dem-Rep	W. Cushing	Dem-Rep	Jan. 2, 1811	confirmed Jan. 3, 1811	1
Alexander Wolcott	Madison	Dem-Rep	W. Cushing	Dem-Rep	Feb. 4, 1811	rejected (9–24); Feb. 13, 1811	9
John Quincy Adams	Madison	Dem-Rep	W. Cushing	Dem-Rep	Feb. 21, 1811	confirmed Feb. 22, 1811	1
Gabriel Duvall	Madison	Dem-Rep	S. Chase	Dem-Rep	Nov. 15, 1811	confirmed Nov. 18, 1811	3
Joseph Story	Madison	Dem-Rep	W. Cushing	Dem-Rep	Nov. 15, 1811	confirmed Nov. 18, 1811	3
Smith Thompson	Monroe	Dem-Rep	Livingston	Dem-Rep	Dec. 5, 1823	confirmed Dec. 9, 1823	4
Robert Trimble	J. Q. Adams	Adams Rep	Todd	Jacksonian	Apr. 11, 1826	confirmed (27–5); May 9, 1826	28
John J. Crittenden	J. Q. Adams	Adams Rep	Trimble	Jacksonian	Dec. 17, 1828	postponed (23–17); February 12, 1829	57 (Note: The number of days elapsed is measured from date the president formally made the nomination to the date of the action to postpone.)
John McLean	Jackson	Jacksonian	Trimble	Jacksonian	Mar. 6, 1829	confirmed Mar. 7, 1829	1
Henry Baldwin	Jackson	Jacksonian	Washington	Jacksonian	Jan. 4, 1830	confirmed (41–2); Jan. 6, 1830	2
James Moore Wayne	Jackson	Democratic	W. Johnson	Natl Rep	Jan. 6, 1835	confirmed Jan. 9, 1835	3
Roger B. Taney	Jackson	Democratic	Duvall	Natl Rep	Jan. 15, 1835	postponed (23–22); March 3, 1835	47
Roger B. Taney	Jackson	Democratic	Marshall	Democratic	Dec. 28, 1835	confirmed (29–15); Mar. 15, 1836	78
Philip P. Barbour	Jackson	Democratic	Duvall	Democratic	Dec. 28, 1835	confirmed (30–11); Mar. 15, 1836	78
John Catron	Jackson	Democratic	new seat	Democratic	Mar. 3, 1837	confirmed (28–15); Mar. 8, 1837	5
William Smith	Jackson	Democratic	new seat	Democratic	Mar. 3, 1837	confirmed (23–18); Mar. 8, 1837	5
John McKinley	Van Buren	Democratic	new seat	Democratic	Sep. 18, 1837	confirmed Sep. 25, 1837	7
Peter Vivian Daniel	Van Buren	Democratic	Barbour	Democratic	Feb. 26, 1841	confirmed (25–5); Mar. 2, 1841	4
John C. Spencer	Tyler	None	Thompson	Whig	Jan. 8, 1844	rejected (21–26); Jan. 31, 1844	23
Reuben Walworth	Tyler	None	Thompson	Whig	Mar. 13, 1844	withdrawn June 17, 1844 (Note: The Senate had earlier voted 27–20 on June 15, 1844 to table the nomination.)	96
Edward King	Tyler	None	Baldwin	Whig	June 5, 1844	postponed (29–18); Jun. 15, 1844	10
John C. Spencer	Tyler	None	Thompson	Whig	June 17, 1844	withdrawn June 17, 1844	0
Reuben Walworth	Tyler	None	Thompson	Whig	June 17, 1844	lapsed	N/A
Reuben Walworth	Tyler	None	Thompson	Whig	Dec. 4, 1844	withdrawn Feb. 6, 1845	64
Edward King	Tyler	None	Baldwin	Whig	Dec. 4, 1844	withdrawn Feb. 8, 1845	66
Samuel Nelson	Tyler	None	Thompson	Whig	Feb. 4, 1845	confirmed Feb. 14, 1845	10
John M. Read	Tyler	None	Baldwin	Whig	Feb. 7, 1845	lapsed	N/A
George Woodward	Polk	Democratic	Baldwin	Democratic	Dec. 23, 1845	rejected (20–29); Jan. 22, 1846	30
Levi Woodbury	Polk	Democratic	Story	Democratic	Dec. 23, 1845	confirmed Jan. 3, 1846	11
Robert Cooper Grier	Polk	Democratic	Baldwin	Democratic	Aug. 3, 1846	confirmed Aug. 4, 1846	1
Benjamin R. Curtis	Fillmore	Whig	Woodbury	Democratic	Dec. 11, 1851	confirmed Dec. 23, 1851	12
Edward A. Bradford	Fillmore	Whig	McKinley	Democratic	Aug. 16, 1852	Tabled; Aug. 31, 1852	15
George E. Badger	Fillmore	Whig	McKinley	Democratic	Jan. 3, 1853	Postponed; Feb. 11, 1853	40
William C. Micou	Fillmore	Whig	McKinley	Democratic	Feb. 14, 1853	lapsed	N/A
John A. Campbell	Pierce	Democratic	McKinley	Democratic	Mar. 21, 1853	confirmed Mar. 22, 1853	1
Nathan Clifford	Buchanan	Democratic	Curtis	Democratic	Dec. 9, 1857	confirmed (26–23); Jan. 12, 1858	34
Jeremiah S. Black	Buchanan	Democratic	Daniel	Democratic	Feb. 5, 1861	lapsed (Note: A motion to bring the nomination up for discussion was defeated 25–26 on February 21, 1861.)	N/A
Noah Haynes Swayne	Lincoln	Republican	McLean	Republican	Jan. 21, 1862	confirmed (38–1); Jan. 24, 1862	3
Samuel Freeman Miller	Lincoln	Republican	Daniel	Republican	July 16, 1862	confirmed July 16, 1862	0
David Davis	Lincoln	Republican	Campbell	Republican	Dec. 1, 1862	confirmed Dec. 8, 1862	7
Stephen Johnson Field	Lincoln	Republican	new seat	Republican	Mar. 6, 1863	confirmed Mar. 10, 1863	4
Salmon P. Chase	Lincoln	Republican	Taney	Republican	Dec. 6, 1864	confirmed Dec. 6, 1864	0
Henry Stanbery	A. Johnson	Natl Union	Catron	Republican	Apr. 16, 1866	lapsed (Note: Nomination effectively voided by the Judicial Circuits Act, signed July 23, 1866, which provided for the gradual elimination of several seats on the Supreme Court.)	N/A
Ebenezer R. Hoar	Grant	Republican	new seat	Republican	Dec. 14, 1869	rejected (24–33); Feb. 3, 1870	51
Edwin Stanton	Grant	Republican	Grier	Republican	Dec. 20, 1869	confirmed (Note: Died prior to becoming a member of the Court.) (46–11); Dec. 20, 1869	0
William Strong	Grant	Republican	Grier	Republican	Feb. 7, 1870	confirmed Feb. 18, 1870	11
Joseph P. Bradley	Grant	Republican	new seat	Republican	Feb. 7, 1870	confirmed (46–9); Mar. 21, 1870	42
Ward Hunt	Grant	Republican	Nelson	Republican	Dec. 3, 1872	confirmed Dec. 11, 1872	8
George Henry Williams	Grant	Republican	S. P. Chase	Republican	Dec. 1, 1873	withdrawn Jan. 8, 1874	38
Caleb Cushing	Grant	Republican	S. P. Chase	Republican	Jan. 9, 1874	withdrawn Jan. 13, 1874	4
Morrison Waite	Grant	Republican	S. P. Chase	Republican	Jan. 19, 1874	confirmed (63–0); Jan. 21, 1874	2
John Marshall Harlan	Hayes	Republican	Davis	Republican	Oct. 16, 1877	confirmed Nov. 29, 1877	44
William Burnham Woods	Hayes	Republican	Strong	Democratic	Dec. 15, 1880	confirmed (39–8); Dec. 21, 1880	6
Stanley Matthews	Hayes	Republican	Swayne	Democratic	Jan. 26, 1881	lapsed	N/A
Stanley Matthews	Garfield	Republican	Swayne	Republican	Mar. 14, 1881	confirmed (24–23); May 12, 1881	59
Horace Gray	Arthur	Republican	Clifford	Split	Dec. 19, 1881	confirmed (51–5); Dec. 20, 1881	1
Roscoe Conkling	Arthur	Republican	Hunt	Split	Feb. 24, 1882	confirmed (39–12); Mar. 2, 1882	6
Samuel Blatchford	Arthur	Republican	Hunt	Split	Mar. 13, 1882	confirmed Mar. 22, 1882	9
Lucius Q. C. Lamar II	Cleveland	Democratic	Woods	Republican	Dec. 6, 1887	confirmed (32–28); Jan. 16, 1888	41
Melville Fuller	Cleveland	Democratic	Waite	Republican	Apr. 30, 1888	confirmed (41–20); July 20, 1888	81
David Josiah Brewer	B. Harrison	Republican	Matthews	Republican	Dec. 4, 1889	confirmed (53–11); Dec. 18, 1889	14
Henry Billings Brown	B. Harrison	Republican	Miller	Republican	Dec. 23, 1890	confirmed Dec. 29, 1890	6
George Shiras Jr.	B. Harrison	Republican	Bradley	Republican	July 19, 1892	confirmed July 26, 1892	7
Howell E. Jackson	B. Harrison	Republican	L. Lamar	Republican	Feb. 2, 1893	confirmed Feb. 18, 1893	16
William B. Hornblower	Cleveland	Democratic	Blatchford	Democratic	Sep. 19, 1893	lapsed	N/A
William B. Hornblower	Cleveland	Democratic	Blatchford	Democratic	Dec. 5, 1893	rejected (24–30); Jan. 15, 1894	41
Wheeler H. Peckham	Cleveland	Democratic	Blatchford	Democratic	Jan. 22, 1894	rejected (32–41); Feb. 16, 1894	25
Edward D. White	Cleveland	Democratic	Blatchford	Democratic	Feb. 19, 1894	confirmed Feb. 19, 1894	0
Rufus W. Peckham	Cleveland	Democratic	H. Jackson	Republican	Dec. 3, 1895	confirmed Dec. 9, 1895	6
Joseph McKenna	McKinley	Republican	Field	Republican	Dec. 16, 1897	confirmed Jan. 21, 1898	36
Oliver W. Holmes Jr.	T. Roosevelt	Republican	Gray	Republican	Dec. 2, 1902	confirmed Dec. 4, 1902	2
William R. Day	T. Roosevelt	Republican	Shiras	Republican	Feb. 19, 1903	confirmed Feb. 23, 1903	4
William Henry Moody	T. Roosevelt	Republican	Brown	Republican	Dec. 3, 1906	confirmed Dec. 12, 1906	9
Horace Harmon Lurton	Taft	Republican	R. Peckham	Republican	Dec. 13, 1909	confirmed Dec. 20, 1909	7
Charles Evans Hughes	Taft	Republican	Brewer	Republican	Apr. 25, 1910	confirmed May 2, 1910	7
Edward D. White	Taft	Republican	Fuller	Republican	Dec. 12, 1910	confirmed Dec. 12, 1910	0
Willis Van Devanter	Taft	Republican	E. D. White	Republican	Dec. 12, 1910	confirmed Dec. 15, 1910	3
Joseph Rucker Lamar	Taft	Republican	Moody	Republican	Dec. 12, 1910	confirmed Dec. 15, 1910	3
Mahlon Pitney	Taft	Republican	J. Harlan	Republican	Feb. 19, 1912	confirmed (50–26); Mar. 13, 1912	23
James C. McReynolds	Wilson	Democratic	Lurton	Democratic	Aug. 19, 1914	confirmed (44–6); Aug. 29, 1914	10
Louis Brandeis	Wilson	Democratic	J. Lamar	Democratic	Jan. 28, 1916	confirmed (47–22); June 1, 1916	125
John Hessin Clarke	Wilson	Democratic	Hughes	Democratic	July 14, 1916	confirmed July 24, 1916	10
William Howard Taft	Harding	Republican	E. D. White	Republican	June 30, 1921	confirmed June 30, 1921	0
George Sutherland	Harding	Republican	Clarke	Republican	Sep. 5, 1922	confirmed Sep. 5, 1922	0
Pierce Butler	Harding	Republican	Day	Republican	Nov. 21, 1922	lapsed	N/A
Pierce Butler	Harding	Republican	Day	Republican	Dec. 5, 1922	confirmed (61–8); Dec. 21, 1922	16
Edward Terry Sanford	Harding	Republican	Pitney	Republican	Jan. 24, 1923	confirmed Jan. 29, 1923	5
Harlan F. Stone	Coolidge	Republican	McKenna	Republican	Jan. 5, 1925	confirmed (71–6); Feb. 5, 1925	31
Charles Evans Hughes	Hoover	Republican	Taft	Republican	Feb. 3, 1930	confirmed (52–26); Feb. 13, 1930; May 7, 1930	10
John J. Parker	Hoover	Republican	Sanford	Republican	Mar. 21, 1930	rejected (39–41); May 7, 1930	47
Owen Roberts	Hoover	Republican	Sanford	Republican	May 9, 1930	confirmed May 20, 1930	11
Benjamin N. Cardozo	Hoover	Republican	Holmes	Republican	Feb. 15, 1932	confirmed Feb. 24, 1932	9
Hugo Black	F. D. Roosevelt	Democratic	Van Devanter	Democratic	Aug. 12, 1937 (Note: Franklin D. Roosevelt's letter of nomination for Hugo Black was undated. August 12, 1937 is the date that letter was received in the Senate.)	confirmed (63–16); Aug. 17, 1937	5
Stanley Forman Reed	F. D. Roosevelt	Democratic	Sutherland	Democratic	Jan. 15, 1938	confirmed Jan. 25, 1938	10
Felix Frankfurter	F. D. Roosevelt	Democratic	Cardozo	Democratic	Jan. 5, 1939	confirmed Jan. 17, 1939	12
William O. Douglas	F. D. Roosevelt	Democratic	Brandeis	Democratic	Mar. 20, 1939	confirmed (62–4); Apr. 4, 1939	15
Frank Murphy	F. D. Roosevelt	Democratic	Butler	Democratic	Jan. 4, 1940	confirmed Jan. 16, 1940	14
Harlan F. Stone	F. D. Roosevelt	Democratic	Hughes	Democratic	June 12, 1941	confirmed June 27, 1941	15
James F. Byrnes	F. D. Roosevelt	Democratic	McReynolds	Democratic	June 12, 1941	confirmed June 12, 1941	0
Robert H. Jackson	F. D. Roosevelt	Democratic	Stone	Democratic	June 12, 1941	confirmed July 7, 1941	25
Wiley Rutledge	F. D. Roosevelt	Democratic	Byrnes	Democratic	Jan. 11, 1943	confirmed Feb. 8, 1943	28
Harold Hitz Burton	Truman	Democratic	O. Roberts	Democratic	Sep. 19, 1945	confirmed Sep. 19, 1945	0
Fred M. Vinson	Truman	Democratic	Stone	Democratic	June 6, 1946	confirmed June 20, 1946	14
Tom C. Clark	Truman	Democratic	Murphy	Democratic	Aug. 2, 1949	confirmed (73–8); Aug. 18, 1949	16
Sherman Minton	Truman	Democratic	W. Rutledge	Democratic	Sep. 15, 1949	confirmed (48–16); Oct. 4, 1949	19
Earl Warren	Eisenhower	Republican	Vinson	Republican	Jan. 11, 1954	confirmed Mar. 1, 1954	49
John Marshall Harlan II	Eisenhower	Republican	R. Jackson	Republican	Nov. 9, 1954	lapsed	N/A
John Marshall Harlan II	Eisenhower	Republican	R. Jackson	Democratic	Jan. 10, 1955	confirmed (71–11); Mar. 16, 1955	65
William J. Brennan Jr.	Eisenhower	Republican	Minton	Democratic	Jan. 14, 1957	confirmed Mar. 19, 1957	64
Charles Evans Whittaker	Eisenhower	Republican	Reed	Democratic	Mar. 2, 1957	confirmed Mar. 19, 1957	17
Potter Stewart	Eisenhower	Republican	Burton	Democratic	Jan. 17, 1959	confirmed (70–17); May 5, 1959	108
Byron White	Kennedy	Democratic	Whittaker	Democratic	Apr. 3, 1962	confirmed Apr. 11, 1962	8
Arthur Goldberg	Kennedy	Democratic	Frankfurter	Democratic	Aug. 31, 1962	confirmed Sep. 25, 1962	25
Abe Fortas	L. Johnson	Democratic	Goldberg	Democratic	July 28, 1965	confirmed Aug. 11, 1965	14
Thurgood Marshall	L. Johnson	Democratic	Clark	Democratic	June 13, 1967	confirmed (69–11); Aug. 30, 1967	78
Abe Fortas	L. Johnson	Democratic	Warren	Democratic	June 26, 1968	withdrawn (Note: Continued to serve as an associate justice.); Oct. 2, 1968	98
Homer Thornberry	L. Johnson	Democratic	Fortas	Democratic	June 26, 1968	withdrawn Oct. 2, 1968	98
Warren E. Burger	Nixon	Republican	Warren	Democratic	May 23, 1969	confirmed (74–3); June 9, 1969	17
Clement Haynsworth	Nixon	Republican	Fortas	Democratic	Aug. 21, 1969	rejected (45–55); Nov. 21, 1969	92
G. Harrold Carswell	Nixon	Republican	Fortas	Democratic	Jan. 19, 1970	rejected (45–51); Apr. 8, 1970	79
Harry Blackmun	Nixon	Republican	Fortas	Democratic	Apr. 15, 1970	confirmed (94–0); May 12, 1970	27
Lewis F. Powell Jr.	Nixon	Republican	H. Black	Democratic	Oct. 22, 1971	confirmed (89–1); Dec. 6, 1971	45
William Rehnquist	Nixon	Republican	J. Harlan II	Democratic	Oct. 22, 1971	confirmed (68–26); Dec. 10, 1971	49
John Paul Stevens	Ford	Republican	Douglas	Democratic	Nov. 28, 1975	confirmed (98–0); Dec. 17, 1975	19
Sandra Day O'Connor	Reagan	Republican	Stewart	Republican	Aug. 19, 1981	confirmed (99–0); Sep. 21, 1981	33
William Rehnquist	Reagan	Republican	Burger	Republican	June 20, 1986	confirmed (65–33); Sep. 17, 1986	89
Antonin Scalia	Reagan	Republican	Rehnquist	Republican	June 24, 1986	confirmed (98–0); Sep. 17, 1986	85
Robert Bork	Reagan	Republican	Powell	Democratic	July 1, 1987	rejected (42–58); Oct. 23, 1987	114
Anthony Kennedy	Reagan	Republican	Powell	Democratic	Nov. 30, 1987	confirmed (97–0); Feb. 3, 1988	65
David Souter	G. H. W. Bush	Republican	Brennan	Democratic	July 25, 1990	confirmed (90–9); Oct. 2, 1990	69
Clarence Thomas	G. H. W. Bush	Republican	T. Marshall	Democratic	July 8, 1991	confirmed (52–48); Oct. 15, 1991	99
Ruth Bader Ginsburg	Clinton	Democratic	B. White	Democratic	June 22, 1993	confirmed (96–3); Aug. 3, 1993	42
Stephen Breyer	Clinton	Democratic	Blackmun	Democratic	May 17, 1994	confirmed (87–9); July 29, 1994	73
John Roberts	G. W. Bush	Republican	O'Connor	Republican	July 29, 2005	withdrawn Sep. 6, 2005	39
John Roberts	G. W. Bush	Republican	Rehnquist	Republican	Sep. 6, 2005	confirmed (78–22); Sep. 29, 2005	23
Harriet Miers	G. W. Bush	Republican	O'Connor	Republican	Oct. 7, 2005	withdrawn Oct. 28, 2005	21
Samuel Alito	G. W. Bush	Republican	O'Connor	Republican	Nov. 10, 2005	confirmed (58–42); Jan. 31, 2006	82
Sonia Sotomayor	Obama	Democratic	Souter	Democratic	June 1, 2009	confirmed (68–31); Aug. 6, 2009	66
Elena Kagan	Obama	Democratic	Stevens	Democratic	May 10, 2010	confirmed (63–37); Aug. 5, 2010	87
Merrick Garland	Obama	Democratic	Scalia	Republican	Mar. 16, 2016	lapsed	293
Neil Gorsuch	Trump	Republican	Scalia	Republican	Feb. 1, 2017	confirmed (54–45); Apr. 7, 2017	65
Brett Kavanaugh	Trump	Republican	Kennedy	Republican	July 10, 2018	confirmed (50–48); Oct. 6, 2018	88
Amy Coney Barrett	Trump	Republican	Ginsburg	Republican	Sep. 29, 2020	confirmed (52–48); Oct. 26, 2020	27
Ketanji Brown Jackson	Biden	Democratic	Breyer	Democratic	Feb. 28, 2022	confirmed (53–47); Apr. 7, 2022	38
Name	President	Party	Justice	Senate Majority party	Date submitted	Outcome (vote) and date	No. of Days

== See also ==
- Thurmond rule
- Senate Judiciary Committee reviews of nominations to the Supreme Court of the United States
- Unsuccessful nominations to the Supreme Court of the United States
