= List of federal judges appointed by James Madison =

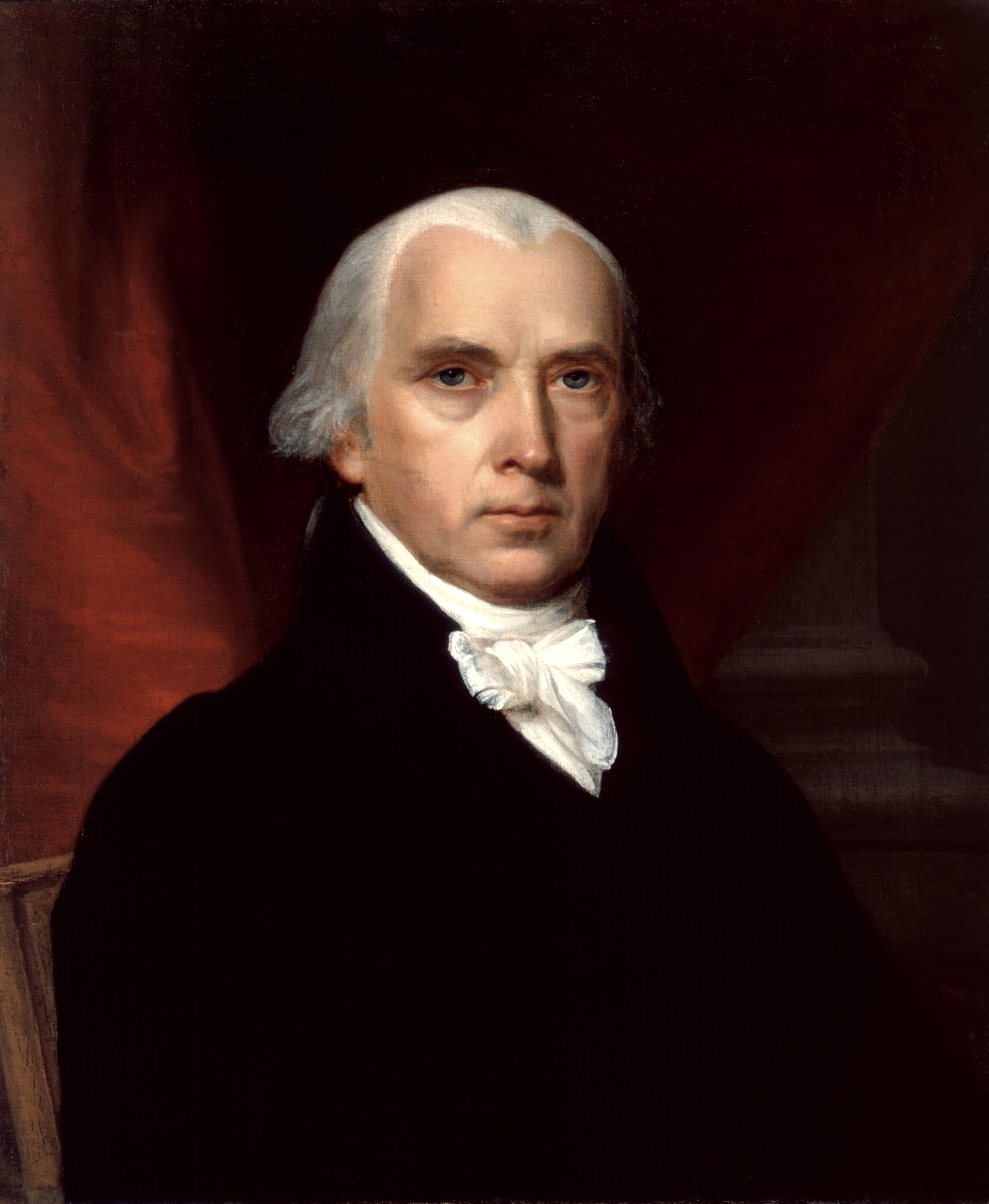
James Madison.

Following is a list of all Article III United States federal judges appointed by President James Madison during his presidency. In total Madison appointed 13 Article III federal judges, including 2 Justices to the Supreme Court of the United States, 2 judges to the United States circuit courts, and 9 judges to the United States district courts. One of Madison's district court appointments was in fact appointed twice, to succeed himself on the same court, having resigned from the first appointment to pursue another political office.

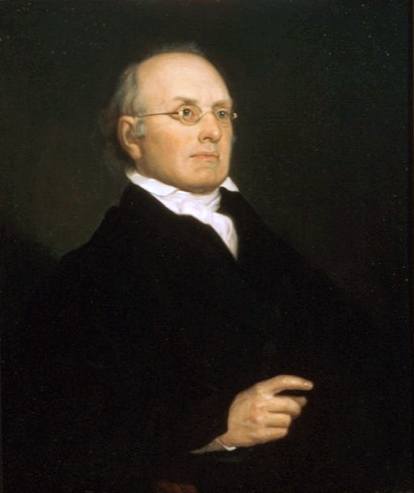
President Madison appointed Joseph Story, the youngest person ever appointed to the Supreme Court, who went on to write many noted opinions.

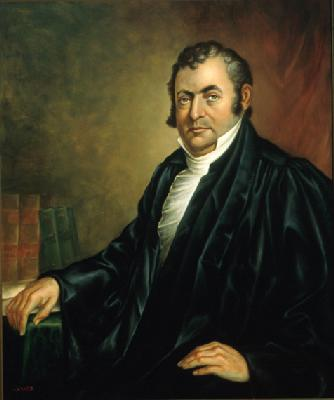
Robert Trimble, appointed as a district court judge by Madison, was later elevated to the Supreme Court by John Quincy Adams.

== United States Supreme Court justices ==
#	Justice	Seat	State	Former justice	Nomination date	Confirmation date	Began active service	Ended active service
1	Gabriel Duvall	4	Maryland	Samuel Chase	November 15, 1811	November 18, 1811	November 18, 1811	January 14, 1835
2	Joseph Story	2	Massachusetts	William Cushing	November 15, 1811	November 18, 1811	November 18, 1811	September 10, 1845

== Circuit courts ==
#	Judge	Circuit	Nomination date	Confirmation date	Began active service	Ended active service
1	Buckner Thruston	D.C.	December 12, 1809	December 13, 1809	December 14, 1809	August 30, 1845
2	James Sewall Morsell	D.C.	January 7, 1815	January 11, 1815	January 11, 1815	March 3, 1863

== District courts ==
#	Judge	Court (Note: See List of United States district and territorial courts)	Nomination date	Confirmation date	Began active service	Ended active service
1	John Tyler Sr.	D. Va.	January 2, 1811	January 3, 1811	January 7, 1811	January 6, 1813
2	John Fisher	D. Del.	April 22, 1812	April 23, 1812	April 23, 1812	April 22, 1823
3	John Drayton	D.S.C.	May 4, 1812	May 7, 1812	May 7, 1812	November 27, 1822
4	William P. Van Ness	D.N.Y.	May 25, 1812	May 26, 1812	May 27, 1812	September 6, 1826
5	Dominic Augustin Hall	D. La.	May 27, 1812	May 28, 1812	June 1, 1812	February 22, 1813
5.1	Dominic Augustin Hall	D. La.	May 29, 1813	June 1, 1813	June 1, 1813	December 19, 1820
6	David Howell	D.R.I.	November 12, 1812	November 16, 1812	November 17, 1812	July 30, 1824
7	St. George Tucker	D. Va.	January 18, 1813	January 19, 1813	January 19, 1813	June 30, 1825
8	William Sanford Pennington	D.N.J.	January 8, 1816	January 9, 1816	July 19, 1815	September 17, 1826
9	Robert Trimble	D. Ky.	January 28, 1817	January 31, 1817	January 31, 1817	May 9, 1826

== See also ==
- Alexander Wolcott Supreme Court nomination
- John Quincy Adams Supreme Court nomination

== Sources ==
- Federal Judicial Center
