= Stephen Breyer Supreme Court nomination =

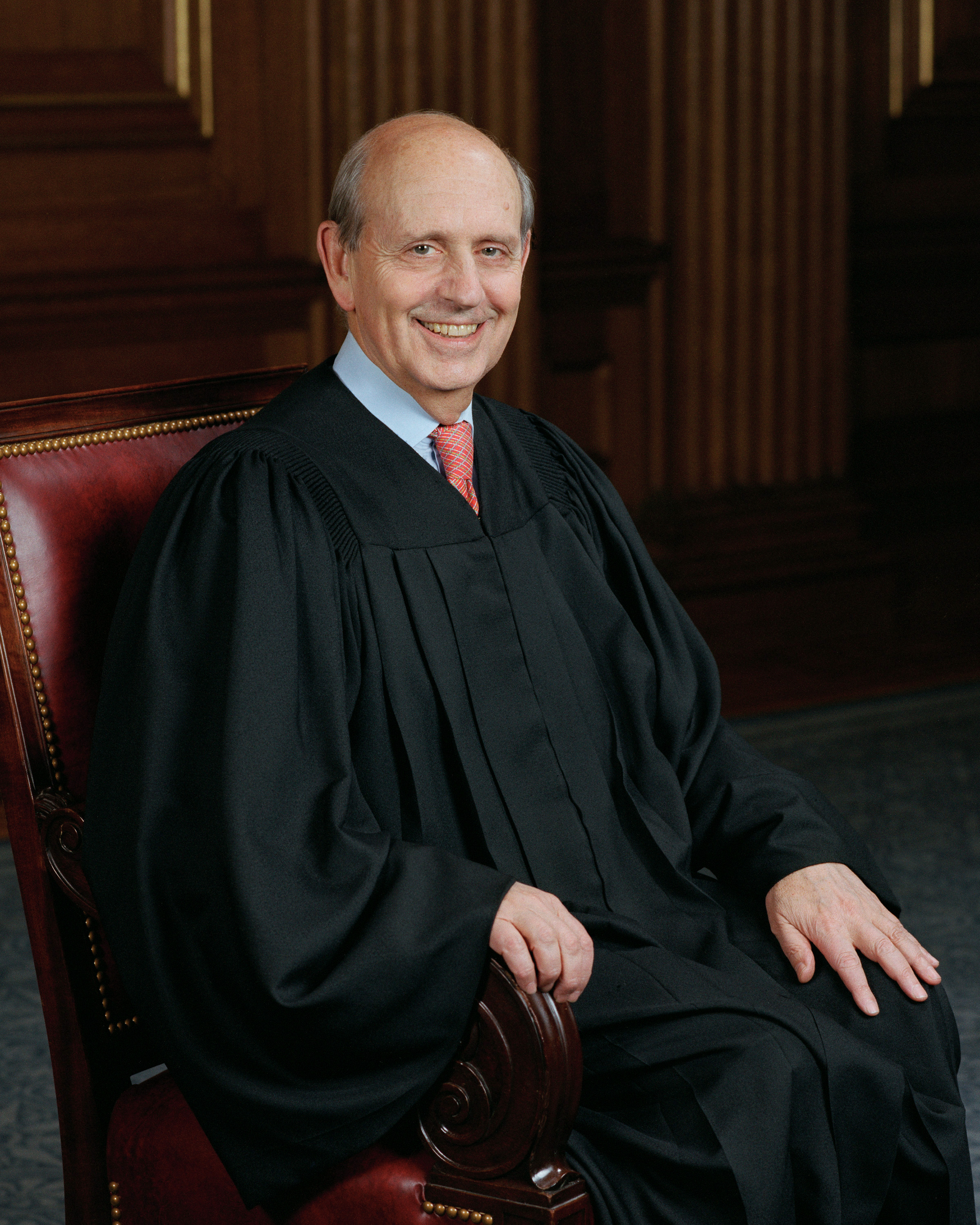
- Stephen Breyer's official portrait
- Nominee: Stephen Breyer
- Nominated by: Bill Clinton (president of the United States)
- Succeeding: Harry Blackmun (associate justice)
- Date nominated: May 17, 1994
- Date confirmed: July 29, 1994
- Outcome: Confirmed by the U.S. Senate

Vote of the Senate Judiciary Committee
- Votes in favor: 18
- Votes against: 0
- Result: Reported favorably

Senate confirmation vote
- Votes in favor: 87
- Votes against: 9
- Not voting: 4

Stephen Breyer was nominated to serve as an associate justice of the Supreme Court of the United States by U.S. President Bill Clinton on May 17, 1994, after the Harry Blackmun's announcement of intent to resign his seat created a pending vacancy on the court. Per the Constitution of the United States, Breyer's nomination was subject to the advice and consent of the United States Senate, which holds the determinant power to confirm or reject nominations to the U.S. Supreme Court. After being his nomination was reviewed and favorably reported on by the Senate Judiciary Committee, Breyer was confirmed by the full Senate in a 87–9 vote on July 29, 1994.

== Background ==
=== Breyer ===
In 1980, after President Jimmy Carter's nomination, Breyer was confirmed by the United States Senate as a U.S. Circuit Court judge by a vote of 80–10. 49 Democratic and 31 Republican senators voted in support of his confirmation. 4 Democratic and 6 Republican senators opposed his nomination. Ten senators (6 Democrats and 4 Republicans) did not vote.

In 1993, upon the recommendation of Orrin Hatch, President Bill Clinton considered both Breyer and Ruth Bader Ginsburg for the seat vacated by Byron White. Clinton ultimately appointed Ginsburg.

Breyer was considered ideologically to be a relative centrist.

=== Blackmun retirement ===
On April 1994, Blackmun declared his intent to retire from the bench in a matter of months, creating a second Supreme Court vacancy for Clinton to fill. By the time of his retirement, Blackmun was considered to be the most liberal justice sitting on the court.

== Search for a nominee ==
After Blackmun announced his retirement, Clinton took five weeks before selecting and announcing Breyer as its nominee. Breyer was not Clinton's first preference to fill Backmun's seat. He initially offered the nomination to George J. Mitchell, the Senate Majority Leader, who was retiring. Mitchell declined. Former governor of Arizona Bruce Babbitt, who had run for Democratic presidential nomination in 1988 and was serving as Secretary of the Interior, was then offered the nomination, but also declined, saying he was looking forward to spending more time with his wife, Harriet C. Babbitt (who was serving as the 12th United States Ambassador to the Organization of American States). Babbitt later said that had he been confirmed to the court, she would have been compelled to resign and that he did not want to cause that. Both Babbitts served in their positions to the end of Clinton's presidency in January 2001. Clinton next offered the nomination to Harriett Woods, a former lieutenant governor of Missouri and two-time Democratic nominee for U.S. Senate. Woods was serving as president of the National Women's Political Caucus. She also declined, and recommended Breyer and U.S. representative Barbara Jordan.

Clinton then turned to Richard S. Arnold, a former Arkansas state representative and chief of staff to Arkansas Governor Dale Bumpers. President Jimmy Carter had nominated Arnold to the United States Court of Appeals for the Eighth Circuit, and the Senate confirmed him on February 20, 1980. He served until 1990. After that, he was serving as chief judge and a member of the Judicial Conference of the United States. Clinton had almost nominated Arnold before; he was the runner-up to Ginsburg. Arnold told Clinton the day before the planned announcement of his nomination that due to serious "health concerns", he had to "defer this honorable nomination".

Initially, Clinton had felt Breyer lacked "soul and passion". But after heavy lobbying by Senators Ted Kennedy and Tom Harkin, Clinton met with Breyer again and decided to nominate him. Roughly thirty minutes after informing Breyer by phone that he would be the nominee, Clinton had his administration share word that Breyer would be the pick. A formal announcement press event with Clinton and Breyer was held on May 16 in the White House Rose Garden. The Senate formally received his nomination on May 17.

Michael S. Berman was assigned to serve as Breyer's "sherpa" (advisor tasked with guiding him through the rigors of their confirmation). He had previously played the same advisory role in Ginsburg's confirmation process.

== Reception to nomination ==
=== Support ===
Douglas I. Foy wrote to the Judiciary Committee on behalf of the Conservation Law Foundation environmental advocacy group, which he was the executive director of, to express support for Breyer's confirmation, writing:

Breyer has fashioned a remarkable record on environmental matters that have come before the First Circuit Court of Appeals. His opinions reflect an unusual sensitivity to natural resource concerns, whether in matters involving air and water pollution, off-shore oil and gas drilling, and clean-up of Boston Harbor, or protection of the Cape Cod National Seashore. The Court's line of decisions on the obligations imposed by NEPA are leading precedents, reflecting a penetrating understanding of the law's requirements and of agencies' cavalier efforts to avoid its application.
Judge Breyer brings a New Englander's common sense to natural resource matters, and couples that common sense with an impressive understanding of administrative procedure and agency foibles. Much of the development of environmental law in the next decade will revolve around the application and enforcement of pivotal federal laws (such as the Clean Air Act, National Energy Act, Magnuson Act, and ISTEA), by agencies, in the states and regions. Stephen Breyer is precisely the kind of judge to whom we should entrust review of agency compliance with those laws. My only regret is that Judge Breyer cannot sit on the Supreme Court and the First Circuit at the same time.

=== Opposition ===
While Breyer would ultimately face little opposition in Senate vote, his nomination was met by disappointment by more liberal wings of the Democratic party. Many liberals were disappointed by the nomination, believing it was out-of-step with earlier promised by Clinton to nominate, "someone with a big heart," and “someone of genuine stature and largeness of ability and spirit." Legal analyst Edward Whelan recalled in 2023,

Clinton had made clear that he wanted to nominate a liberal statesman in the mold of New York governor Mario Cuomo or Senate majority leader George Mitchell. Babbitt, a former Arizona governor, current Secretary of Interior, and favorite of environmentalists, fit the bill. But Clinton ended up picking a federal appellate judge best known for his technocratic expertise in regulation and antitrust.

The week after Clinton nominated Breyer, Stephen Reinhardt, a leading liberal federal judge, wrote an open letter to Breyer published in The Los Angeles Times in which expressed that Breyer had not been sort of judge Clinton had earlier promised to nominate. He urged him to "re-eximine" his judicial philosophy, and to ditch his technocratic manner for a more passionate approach. writing,

You can be [i.e., remain] cold, purely intellectual and wholly technical, or you can become what the President said he was looking for--a justice who is compassionate, who has a big heart...The sad truth is that you are not only succeeding Harry Blackmun. You are the only potential successor to William Brennan, Thurgood Marshall, Earl Warren, William O. Douglas and the whole line of humanitarian justices who understood the importance of compassion and the need to do justice, not just administer law. There are lots of able technicians who understand law. The nation, however, is entitled to at least one justice with vision, with breadth, with idealism, with--to say the word despised in the Clinton Administration--a liberal philosophy and an expansive approach to jurisprudence.

=== American Bar Association assessment ===
As it routinely does for judicial nominees, the American Bar Association's Standing Committee on Federal Judiciary conducted an evaluation of the nominee's qualification. The review assessed integrity, judicial temperament, professional competence. The review did not weight political ideology or his views on specific matters that the court might hear. The committee unanimously gave Breyer its strongest affirmative endorsement of qualification, determining him to be "well qualified" on the basis of its evaluated criteria.

The committee's chair, Robert P. Watkins, described the lengths of the investigation it conducted to inform its assessment,

In conducting the investigation members of the Committee personally interviewed more than 300 federal judges, including present and retired members of the Supreme Court of the United States, members of the Federal Courts of Appeals, members of the Federal District Courts, Federal Magistrate Judges, Federal Bankruptcy Judges, and members of State Courts. The investigation included all colleagues of Chief Judge Breyer on the United States Court of Appeals for the First Circuit, all Federal District Court Judges from the District of Massachusetts, and all the justices on the Supreme Judicial Court of Massachusetts. Numerous federal and state court judges from the other states in the First Circuit were also interviewed.
Members of the Committee personally questioned several hundred other individuals, including practicing lawyers throughout the United States, former law clerks and lawyers who have appeared before Chief Judge Breyer. Committee members also interviewed law school deans, faculty members of law schools and constitutional scholars throughout the United States, including professors at Harvard Law School, where Chief Judge Breyer has served on the faculty since 1967.

....It has been the practice of the Committee to ask groups of distinguished legal scholars and Supreme Court practitioners to review independently all of the opinions written by nominees for the Supreme Court. This practice was followed again here and Chief Judge Breyer's opinions were reviewed by:
(1) a Reading Group of distinguished lawyers chaired by Rex E. Lee, formerly Solicitor General of the United States and presently President of Brigham Young University,consisting of a diverse group of 10 lawyers, all of whom have practices and argued cases in the Supreme Court; and
(2) a Reading Group chaired by Professor Nicholas S. Zeppos of Vanderbilt University School of Law, consisting of 26 members of that law school's faculty.

....The two Reading Groups reported to the Committee their independent analyses of Chief Judge Breyer's opinions and other writings. These reports were evaluated by the members of our Committee, who also read opinions of Chief Judge Breyer and his published writings on a variety of legal subjects.

Watkins also noted that, as a resource, the committee also had the earlier report it had prepared in 1980 for Breyer's federal appeals court nomination. In 1980, a majority of the Committee had found him to be "qualified", and a substantial minority of the committee had unsuccessfully supported the strongest affirmative endorsement of his qualifications as "well qualified".

Watkins shared that in its new 1994 review, the committee found on the question of integrity,"Breyer has earned and enjoys an excellent general reputation for his integrity and character. No one interviewed by the Committee had any question or doubt in this regard." On the question of his temperate, the committee found that, "Breyer's judicial temperament also meets the highest standards set by the Committee for appointment to the Supreme Court....Breyer clearly possesses and exhibits the highest level of judicial temperament." On the question of professional competence, the committee found, "Chief Judge Breyer's educational background amply prepared him for service on the Supreme Court of the United States". Watkins elaborated

Our Committee is fully satisfied that Chief Judge Breyer meets the highest standard of professional competence required for a seat on the Supreme Court. His academic training, his broad experience in the Federal Government, his service on the faculty of a distinguished law school, his scholarly writings and his distinguished service for fourteen years (four as Chief Judge) on the Court of Appeals dealing with many of the same kinds of matters that will come before the Supreme Court, fully establish his professional competence.

Watkins further noted, "the comprehensive reports submitted to the Committee by the two Reading Groups of scholars and Supreme Court practitioners confirm the Committee's own conclusions concerning the scholarship and writing ability of Chief Judge Breyer." The chairman of one of the reading groups assembled for the review wrote in summary of the group's assessment,

Judge Breyer is a person of enormous intellectual ability with an outstanding ability to write clearly and persuasively. His opinions reflect a wide breadth of knowledge about the law and an overriding commitment to deeply principled and objective decision making. His work is evidence of a judge keenly aware of the power and corresponding responsibility that go with his office.

The chairman of the other reading group wrote in summary of the group's assessment,

Judge Breyer's scholarly ability was praised by virtually every Committee member. He was found to "display the intellectual habits associated with the most respected thinking of our times: a preference for the complex over the simple and the particular over the general, a willingness to suspend judgment, and a robust tolerance of conceptual ambiguity." His opinions, furthermore, repeatedly demonstrate "a realistic assessment" of "evolving case law," and "are generally well-researched and complete without being pedantic." "Whenever there is a significant debate about....applicable legal principles, Judge Breyer exhibits a determined effort to analyze and apply the governing doctine....his work product is not only scholarly, it is also free from recrimination or insinuation, even when he seems plainly skeptical. Judge Breyer's opinions are careful... tolerant and polite

The later group's chairman personally expressed their own view on Breyer,

He is a lawyer's lawyer and a judge's judge. He is careful, scholarly, dispassionate, and objective. Furthermore, he recognizes that there are limits to his own abilities, as a jurist, to resolve every dispute engendered by the contentious press of modern life.

== Breyer's testimony before Judiciary Committee (July 12–14) ==
After the nomination was sent to the senate, it was referred to the Senate Judiciary Committee for a review, as is the longtime standard procedure for such nominations. The committee was chaired by Senator Joe Biden of Delaware (a Democrat), with Senator Orrin Hatch serving as the committee's Ranking Republican member. By 1994, it had become standard practice for the Judiciary Committee to review nominations by holding hearings that included testimony from the nominee. Hearings on Breyer's were held conducted the course of four days, from July 12 through 15, with the first three days featuring testimony by Breyer, followed by a final day of hearings featuring testimony from panels of public witnesses. In his testimony, Breyer was subject to questioning by members of the committee.

The committee member who was by far the least friendly towards Breyer's nomination was Howard Metzenbaum, a liberal Ohio Democrat who had already announced that he would retire rather than seek reelection in the November election for his seat. Senator Metzenbaum grilled Breyer and offered criticisms of him during Breyer's testimony.

=== Discussion of Breyer's investment in Lloyd's ===
A matter that was discussed multiple times was an investment Breyer held in Lloyd's of London's liability insurance, and concern that it could pose a conflict of interest. On his first day of testimony, Breyer pledged that he would take any necessary steps that he could to end his association with Lloyd's.

On July 14, Senator Metzenbaum brought up the case United States v. Ottati & Goss, arguing that Breyer should have recused himself from it but had failed to. The case involved the liability that polluters and their insurance companies held for cleaning up hazardous waste. Metzenbaum argued that since Breyer held an investment with Lloyd's of London that would be effected by a change in law on environmental liability of insurers, he should have recused himself. This matter posed what Neil Lewis of The Washington Post observed was the "only point of controversy" to arise during Breyer's days of testimony.

Metzenbaum was harsh in criticism of Breyer over this. Breyer argued he was certain that he had done nothing wrong in the matter. Reporters noted that, when facing heat from with Metzenbaum over, this the nominee appeared visibly frustrated for the first time in his confirmation hearings. After Metzenbaum characterized Geoffrey C. Hazard (an ethics expert and professor at the University of Pennsylvania Law School) as having labeled had called Breyer's decision to invest in liability insurance imprudent in a letter that had been submitted to the committee, Ted Kennedy interjected. Kennedy, a committee member who was Breyer's nomination's chief Senate proponent, spoke out in defense of Breyer, and asserted that Metzenbaum was offering a distortion of what Hazard had found. Kennedy noted that Metzenbaum's, characterization differed from what Hazard had actually written, with Hazard only going so far as to say that it was "possibly imprudent". Senator Hatch agreed with Kennedy that Metzenbaum's characterization differed from what had actually been written in Hazard's letter. Amid this heated exchange, Kennedy read the exact written remarks of Hazard into the record. Harzard had actually written, different from Metzenbaum's characterization

You have asked for my opinion on whether Judge Breyer committed a violation of judicial ethics in investing as a "Lloyd's name" in insurance underwriting while being a Federal judge. In my opinion there was no violation of judicial ethics. In my view it was possibly imprudent for a person who is a judge to have such an investment because of the potential for possible conflict of interest and because of possible appearance of impropriety. However, in light of the facts, no conflict of interest or appearance of conflict materialized.

The week after the hearings, the editorial board of the Roanoke Times opined that while this matter drew the most attention of anything that came up during the confirmation hearings, "nothing damning emerged, and neither the judge nor senators said anything to cast doubt on the wisdom of this nomination. Controversy over Breyer's investments doubtless will fade." The Tampa Bay Times observed that,

Legal ethics experts who have examined Breyer's involvement in the 1990 toxic-dump decision say it's too much of a stretch to call it a conflict of interest, and nothing that came out during the hearings would cause most observers to conclude otherwise. But the case does suggest that in making one investment and one legal decision, at least, Breyer didn't think through the appearances of his actions.

The Tampa Bay Times also, however, opined that Metzenbaum's grilling of Breyer on this matter may ultimately have provided a worthwhile service in delivering a "consciousness raising" to the nominee, writing,

If Metzenbaum's insistence on a thorough airing of the matter heightened Breyer's sensitivity to such perceptions, as it seemed to when the discussion got a little bit testy Thursday, then it was an exercise worth doing. A little consciousness-raising can do a judge good now and then.

=== Discussion of antitrust law ===
Metzenbaum expressed his displeasure that Breyer, "seem[ed] to see antitrust laws in terms of abstract economics," and "almost always vote[d] against the very people the antitrust laws are in place to protect." He remarked to Breyer during the hearings,

You seem to see antitrust laws in terms of abstract economics. And it seems that theories of economic efficiency displayed in complicated charts … and graphs replace individual justice for small businesses and consumers.

==== Discussion of Breyer's writings on government regulation ====
Other discussion during the hearing surrounded scholarly works that Breyer had authored on the subject of government regulations. Breyer had previously authored two books on the subject of government regulation, in which he offered arguments that many of the expenses America spends on health and safety had been poorly spent due to public priorities often being misguidedly reactive to sensationalist news stories. A heated exchange emerged on this between Breyer and Committee Chair Biden emerged over this, with Biden taking some issue with the position Breyer offered. In the hearings, Breyer offered in explanation of his argument, "the problem is spending a lot of money over here to save a statistical life that may not even exist, at the same time that there are women with breast cancer who would live but who don't, because they can't afford or find a place for the mammograms," to which Biden admonished Breyer, "I think it's incredibly presumptuous and elitist for political scientists to conclude that the American people...would change their cultural values if, in fact, they were aware of the cost-benefit analysis."

== Testimony of public witnesses before the Judiciary Committee (July 15) ==
=== List of witnesses ===
On the final day of the hearings, several panels of public witnesses testified on Breyer's suitability for confirmation to the court. The panels of witnesses were:

- Robert P. Watkins (chair of the American Bar Association Standing Committee on the Federal Judiciary) and Michael S. Greco First Circuit Representative to the American Bar Association Standing Committee on the Federal Judiciary)
- Gerhard Casper (president of Stanford University) and Kathleen M. Sullivan (professor at Stanford University Law School)
- Paige Comstock Cunningham (president of Americans United for Life and Michael Farris (president of Home School Legal Defense Association)
- Jose Trias Monge (former justice of the Supreme Court of Puerto Rico), Margaret H. Marshall (vice president and general counsel of Harvard University), and Helen G. Corrothers (visiting fellow at the National Institute for Justice, and former commissioner of the U.S. Sentencing Commission)
- Ralph Nader (consumer advocacy litigator); Sidney M. Wolfe (of Citizen's Group); Lloyd Constantine (of Constantine & Associates); and Ralph Zestes (of the Kogod College of Business Administration at American University
- Robert Pitofsky (professor of law at the Georgetown University Law Center); Cass R. Sunstein (professor at the University of Chicago Law School and University of Chicago Department of Political Science) and Martha Matthews (staff attorney at the National Center for Youth Law, and former law clerk to Judge Breyer)
- Barbara Paul Robinson (of the Association of the Bar of the City of New York); Paulette Brown (National Bar Association, on behalf of the Coalition of the Bar Associations of Color); Brian Sun (president of the National Asian-Pacific American Bar Association); Richard Monette (director of the National Native American Bar Association); Wilfredo Caraballo (president of the Hispanic National Bar Association)

=== Ralph Nader's testimony ===
The harshest criticism any witnesses offered of Breyer came from consumer advocate Ralph Nader. Nader offered vociferous opposition to the nomination, alleging that Breyer had fought for the "conservation of existing power alignments" and had a "record on antitrust [that] is extraordinarily one-sided [in favor of large corporate inteterests]" He remarked,

[A] nominee such as Judge Breyer, who is insensitive to the laws’ needs to discipline the excesses and concentrations of corporate power, a nominee who rests his proposals on erroneous reality, factual error and fantasy, and, above all, a nominee who rejects the efficacy of ever-improving democratic participation by the people in making these agencies of Government work better is neither pragmatic, neither realistic, nor moderate. He is extremist. He is ridden with fantasy, and he is insensitive on the ground to the health and safety needs of the American people, and his nomination should be rejected on those grounds alone.

Nader testified beside Sidney M. Wolfe, an associate of his. In her testimony, Wolfe argued that Breyer had mischaracterized the facts of the case in Johnson v. SCA Disposal Services of New Hampshire when he wrote about it in one of his books.

== Judiciary Committee vote ==
On July 19, the Judiciary Committee voted 18–0 to report favorably on the nomination.

On July 29, Ranking Member Hatch presented the committee's report to the full Senate for submission into the record.

== Senate debate prior to confirmation vote ==
Debate by the full senate was largely praiseworthy of the nomination, with members of both party largely expressing their approval.

Helen Dewar of The Washington Post reflected that,

The Senate's bipartisan embrace of Ginsburg and Breyer contrasted with acrimonious debates over some nominees of presidents George [H. W.] Bush and Ronald Reagan and with the increasingly partisan battles over Clinton's domestic legislative initiatives and conduct of foreign policy.

=== Liberal praise and support ===
The nomination received general support from liberals. Such support was, in part, encouraged by liberal Senate stalwart Ted Kennedy's strong backing of the nomination.

=== Conservative praise and support ===
Several conservative Republican senators supported the nomination, offering praise for Breyer. Hatch called Breyer a, "moderate pragmatist". Strom Thurmond opined that, "Breyer does not seem to have an ideological bent to move the court in one direction or another." Hatch also offered rare right wing Republican praise of Clinton, hailing Clinton's inclusion of consultation with Republican senators during his search for a nominee. In general, conservatives were quite thrilled with Clinton’s nomination of Breyer, as opposed to other potential Supreme Court candidates to whom they would have had stronger objections.

=== Liberal criticisms ===
Metzenbaum decided that he would vote in support of the nomination, but made note that he did so with no enthusiasm, remarking that his vote was cast, "with serious reservations and a heavy heart...[I]t is not a vote that will make me particularly proud." He again voiced criticism of Breyer's record on anti-trust matters, which he argued were far too favorable to corporations.

=== Conservative criticisms ===
Several anti-abortion conservative Republican senators expressed dissatisfaction with the likelihood that Breyer would side in favor of retaining precedent such as Roe v. Wade that protected access to abortions. Others believed that he went insufficiently far in his support of protecting property rights.

Many conservative Republicans that offered criticism of Breyer still committed to vote in support of confirmation, not expecting that Clinton was likely to nominate any justice they'd find preferable to Breyer. Senator Phil Gramm noted that for any faults, Breyer was, "as good as we [conservatives] have a right to expect."

=== Opposition by nine Republican senators ===
Richard Lugar (Republican from Indiana) had been the first senator to declare their opposition to Breyer's nomination. He had announced his opposition on July 22, citing, "substantial doubts about his prudence and good judgement." Lugar based his opposition upon Breyer's past failure decision not to himself from the insurer's pollution liability matter that Metzenbaum had noted during the hearings process. Breyer's confirmation was the only of thee thirteen Supreme Court confirmation votes that took place during Lugar's senate tenure in which he cast a vote against confirmation. Lugar would essentially served as the leader of the small faction of Republican senators who were the sole votes against the nomination. While Lugar was considered to be a relatively moderate Republican, the other Republicans who joined him in voting against the nomination were hardline conservatives. Those who joined him cited the same concerns as Lugar, but also voiced additional concerns including issue with Breyer's record on property law and abortion.

During senate debate on the nomination, Lugar argued, "[Breyer's] poor judgment now places him in an unnecessarily embarrassing predicament which erodes public trust." Hatch responded to Lugar's criticism by defending Breyer, asserting that Breyer had recused himself from cases involving the Lloyd's investment, and that "An investment that turns sour is not necessarily a disqualifying event."

== Confirmation vote ==
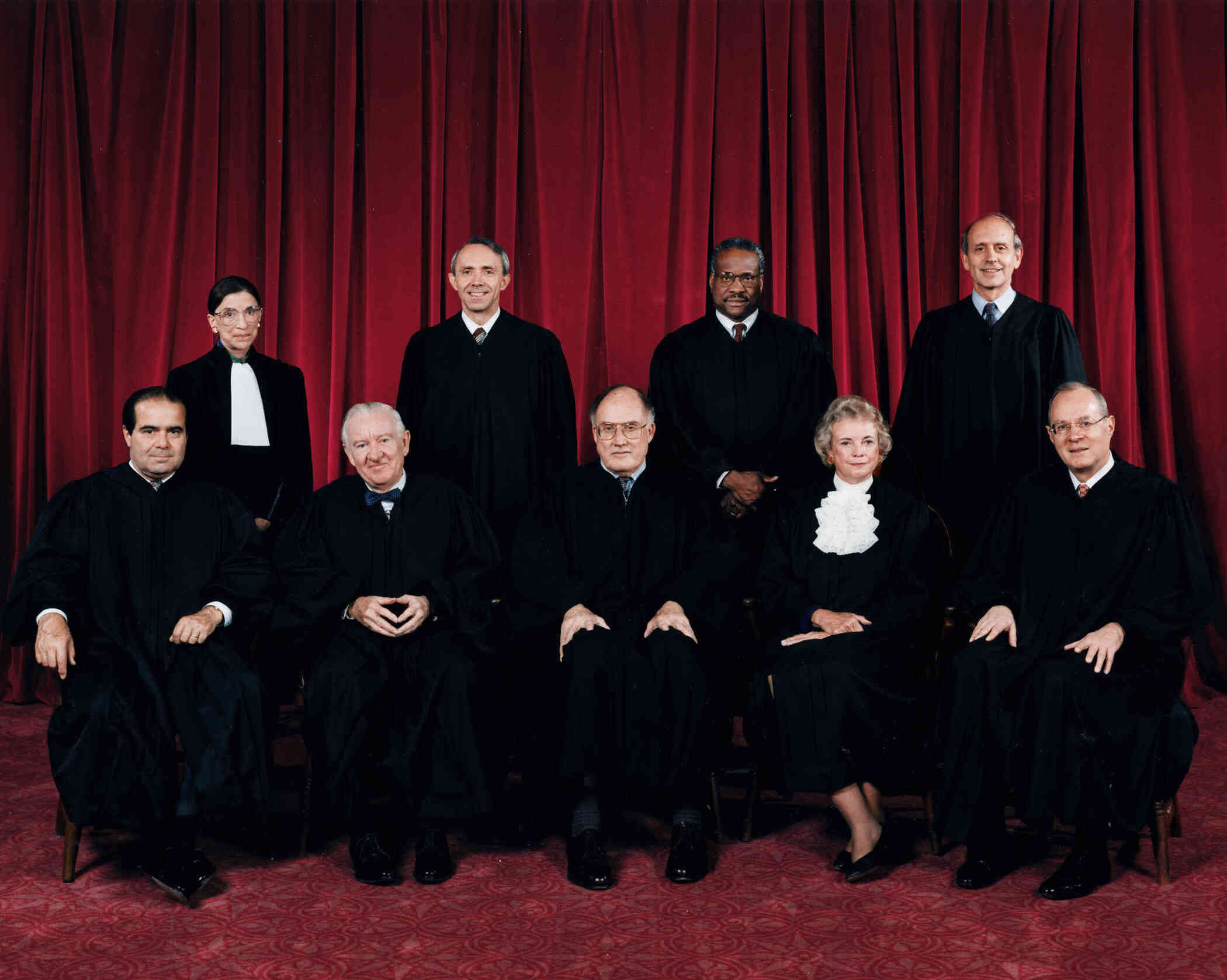
September 1994 group portrait of Breyer (back row, rightmost) and the other Supreme Court justices

Breyer was confirmed by the Senate on July 29, 1994, by an 87 to 9 vote, and received his commission on August 3.

Breyer is the most recent justice to be confirmed with such large consensus of Senators, with 90.63% support among senators who voted. As of 2025, all eight subsequent confirmation votes have seen much greater opposition, with the confirmation of John Roberts being the only subsequent confirmation to receive more than two-thirds support, and the only subsequent confirmation to receive support from a majority of members in the Senate minority party caucus. (Note: Roberts' 2005 confirmation as chief justice received the 23 votes in support and 22 votes in opposition from members of the Senate Democratic caucus. This included Jim Jeffords, an independent Democrat who voted in support of Roberts' confirmation)

Among the senators voting for the nomination were five who would later serve as nominees on both parties' presidential tickets: Bob Dole (Republican nominee for president in 1996) (Note: Dole had also, previously, been the Republican nominee for vice president in 1976); Joe Lieberman (Democratic nominee for vice president in 2000); John Kerry (Democratic nominee for president in 2004); John McCain (Republican nominee for president in 2008); and Joe Biden (a Democrat who was elected president in 2020 and vice president in 2008 and 2012). Both incumbent Senate party leaders (Democratic Majority Leader George J. Mitchell and Republican Minority Leader Bob Dole) voted for the nomination, as did several senators who would later serve as their party's Senate leader (Democrats Tom Daschle and Harry Reid; Republican Mitch McConnell) and one senator who had formerly served as his party's senate leader (Democrat Robert Byrd).

Vote on confirmation of Breyer
July 29, 1994	Party		Total votes
July 29, 1994	Democratic	Republican	Total votes
Yea	54	33	87
Nay	0	9	9
Absent	2	2	4
Result: Confirmed
Roll call vote on the nomination: Senator / Party / State / Vote; Daniel Akaka / R / Hawaii / Yea; Max Baucus / R / Montana / Yea; Bob Bennett / R / Utah / Yea; Joe Biden / D / Delaware / Yea; Jeff Bingaman / D / New Mexico / Yea; Kit Bond / R / Missouri / Yea; David Boren / D / Oklahoma / Yea; Barbara Boxer / D / California / Yea; Bill Bradley / D / New Jersey / Yea; John Breaux / D / Louisiana / Yea; Hank Brown / R / Colorado / Yea; Richard Bryan / D / Nevada / Yea; Dale Bumpers / D / Arkansas / Yea; Conrad Burns / R / Montana / Nay; Robert Byrd / D / West Virginia / Yea; Ben Nighthorse Campbell / D / Colorado / Yea; John Chafee / R / Rhode Island / Yea; Dan Coats / R / Indiana / Nay; Thad Cochran / R / Mississippi / Yea; William Cohen / R / Maine / Yea; Kent Conrad / D / North Dakota / Yea; Paul Coverdell / R / Georgia / Nay; Larry Craig / R / Idaho / Yea; Al D'Amato / R / New York / Yea; John Danforth / R / Missouri / Yea; Tom Daschle / D / South Dakota / Yea; Dennis DeConcini / D / Arizona / Yea; Chris Dodd / D / Connecticut / Yea; Bob Dole / R / Kansas / Yea; Pete Domenici / R / New Mexico / Yea; Byron Dorgan / D / North Dakota / Yea; David Durenberger / R / Minnesota / Absent; J. James Exon / D / Nebraska / Yea; Lauch Faircloth / R / North Carolina / Yea; Russ Feingold / D / Wisconsin / Yea; Dianne Feinstein / D / California / Yea; Wendell Ford / D / Kentucky / Yea; John Glenn / D / Ohio / Yea; Slade Gorton / R / Washington / Yea; Bob Graham / D / Florida / Absent; Phil Gramm / R / Texas / Yea; Chuck Grassley / R / Iowa / Yea; Judd Gregg / R / New Hampshire / Yea; Tom Harkin / D / Iowa / Yea; Orrin Hatch / R / Utah / Yea; Mark Hatfield / R / Oregon / Yea; Howell Heflin / D / Alabama / Yea; Jesse Helms / R / North Carolina / Nay; Fritz Hollings / D / South Carolina / Yea; Kay Bailey Hutchison / R / Texas / Yea; Daniel Inouye / D / Hawaii / Yea; Jim Jeffords / R / Vermont / Yea; J. Bennett Johnston / D / Louisiana / Yea; Nancy Kassebaum / R / Kansas / Yea; Dirk Kempthorne / R / Idaho / Yea; Ted Kennedy / D / Massachusetts / Yea; Bob Kerrey / D / Nebraska / Yea; John Kerry / D / Massachusetts / Yea; Herb Kohl / D / Wisconsin / Yea; Frank Lautenberg / D / New Jersey / Yea; Patrick Leahy / D / Vermont / Yea; Carl Levin / D / Michigan / Yea; Joe Lieberman / D / Connecticut / Yea; Trent Lott / R / Mississippi / Nay; Richard Lugar / R / Indiana / Nay; Connie Mack III / R / Florida / Yea; Harlan Mathews / D / Tennessee / Yea; John McCain / R / Arizona / Yea; Mitch McConnell / R / Kentucky / Yea; Howard Metzenbaum / D / Ohio / Yea; Barbara Mikulski / D / Maryland / Yea; George J. Mitchell / D / Maine / Yea; Carol Moseley Braun / D / Illinois / Yea; Daniel Patrick Moynihan / D / New York / Yea; Frank Murkowski / R / Alaska / Nay; Patty Murray / D / Washington / Yea; Don Nickles / R / Oklahoma / Nay; Sam Nunn / D / Georgia / Yea; Robert Packwood / R / Oregon / Yea; Claiborne Pell / D / Rhode Island / Absent; Larry Pressler / R / South Dakota / Yea; David Pryor / D / Arkansas / Yea; Harry Reid / D / Nevada / Yea; Donald Riegle / D / Michigan / Yea; Chuck Robb / D / Virginia / Yea; Jay Rockefeller / D / West Virginia / Yea; William Roth / R / Delaware / Yea; Paul Sarbanes / D / Maryland / Yea; James Sasser / D / Tennessee / Yea; Richard Shelby / D / Alabama / Yea; Paul Simon / D / Illinois / Yea; Alan Simpson / R / Wyoming / Yea; Bob Smith / R / New Hampshire / Nay; Arlen Specter / R / Pennsylvania / Yea; Ted Stevens / R / Alaska / Yea; Strom Thurmond / R / South Carolina / Yea; Malcolm Wallop / R / Wyoming / Absent; John Warner / R / Virginia / Yea; Paul Wellstone / D / Minnesota / Yea; Harris Wofford / D / Pennsylvania / Yea
