= Alexander Wolcott =

American politician (1758–1828)

Customs Collector at Middletown, Connecticut
- In office 1802 – June 26, 1828

Personal details
- Born: September 15, 1758 Windsor, Connecticut, British; America
- Died: June 26, 1828 (aged 69) Middletown, Connecticut, U.S.
- Party: Democratic-Republican
- Spouse(s): Frances Burbank (1785–1800); Lucy Waldo (1807–1828)
- Children: 2 daughters 2 sons
- Education: Yale University (BA)
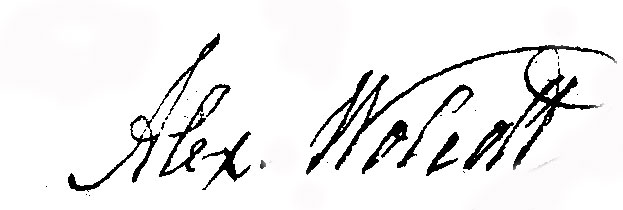
- Signature

Alexander Wolcott (September 15, 1758 – June 26, 1828) was a United States politician, customs inspector, and nominee to the Supreme Court of the United States. Nominated by James Madison in 1811, to replace the late William Cushing, he was rejected by the United States Senate by a vote of 9–24. He was later a delegate to the 1818 convention that drafted the Constitution of Connecticut.

== Early and family life ==
Wolcott was born in Windsor, Connecticut, on September 15, 1758, to Mary Richards Wolcott. His father, also Alexander Wolcott, was a medical doctor who assisted the Patriot forces during the American Revolutionary War. He had an elder half sister, Lydia Wolcott Austin (1737–1820) as well as two sisters – Esther Wolcott Treat (1749–1841) and Elizabeth Wolcott Wolcott (1763–1817) – and a brother, Guy Wolcott (1763–1823). The younger Alexander Wolcott attended Yale College, where he studied law and graduated in 1778. He went on to practice law in Massachusetts and Connecticut.

After marrying Frances Burbank in 1785, he settled in Middletown, Connecticut. They had two sons and two daughters.

=== Alexander Wolcott III ===
Their son, Alexander Wolcott Jr. (or III) (1790–1830), also attended Yale, became a surgeon's mate during the War of 1812 and then had a private medical practice in Boston and Vincennes, Indiana before becoming a federal Indian agent for the Chicago Agency. During his time in Chicago, he married Ellen Marion Kinzie (daughter of John Kinzie) in 1823, the first recorded marriage in Chicago. He died in 1830. Wolcott Avenue in Chicago is named after him.

== Political role in Connecticut ==
Wolcott served as the Democratic-Republican Party's leader in the Connecticut General Assembly from 1796 to 1801. In 1800, Democratic-Republicans in Connecticut formally organized the Thomas Jefferson presidential campaign. The inaugural meeting took place at the residence of Pierpont Edwards in New Haven, Connecticut, and Wolcott was among the leaders in Connecticut who were supporters of the campaign. After the 1800 presidential election, Wolcott was one of the Connecticut Republicans that the administration consulted on appointments. In July 1801, Jefferson appointed him as collector of customs as Middletown, a position that was worth $3,000 at the time and which he held until his death. Pierpont Edwards had insisted that Wolcott was brought in to replace the previous collector of customs, described as "a violent, irritable, priest-ridden, implacable, ferocious federalist".

In the 1802 Connecticut elections, Wolcott was involved in a controversy where he was accused of profligacy by a close friend of his, Senator Uriah Tracy. In a letter to Senator James Hillhouse, who had also joined Tracy in accusing Wolcott of profligacy, Wolcott said, "If I am a profligate man, to prove it will not be difficult, nor to you an unpleasant task." Prior to elections in April 1804, a pamphlet, allegedly written by Federalist David Daggett, accused Wolcott of striving "to destroy the state" and "unworthy of any trust or respect".

In 1806, Wolcott caused a scandal by accusing Federalists of having "priests and deacons, judges and justices, sheriffs and surveyors, with a host of corporations and privileged orders, to aid their elections." He went on to say: "Let it be known that plain men, without titles or hope of offices, can do better than the mercenary troops of Federalism." In 1807, Wolcott was the prosecutor in a case in which Azel Backus had been accused of libeling Jefferson. With Pierpont Edwards as the judge, there were widespread accusations of bias, as both were fervent supporters of Jefferson.

== Supreme Court nomination ==
Wolcott was nominated by President James Madison to the US Supreme Court in 1811 to fill a vacancy left by the death of William Cushing. He had not been Madison's first choice, as he had nominated former US Attorney General Levi Lincoln already in January 1811. Despite being confirmed by the Senate, Lincoln refused the honor. Madison's decision to nominate Wolcott was taken for primarily political reasons. Although Wolcott was recognized as a leader among Republicans, and Lincoln supported his nomination, many others criticized Madison and his choice. The Columbian Centinel wrote that "Even those most acquainted with modern degeneracy were astounded at his abominable nomination." The New-York Gazette Advertiser decried his nomination by writing: "Oh degraded Country! How humiliating to the friends of moral virtue – of religion and of all that is dear to the lover of his Country!"

Opposition to Wolcott's nomination centered on two main reasons: his strict enforcement of controversial non-intercourse and embargo acts as customs inspector and his lack of qualifications. Due to lack of judicial experience, Wolcott was widely believed to be unqualified and incapable of serving in such an important judicial position. On the second point, Wolcott was criticized for his strict enforcement and support of the Embargo Act of 1807. The law, passed under Jefferson, prevented goods from England, France, and other countries, from entering the US. It was extremely unpopular among merchants and farmers whose profits were significantly harmed by the law.

Wolcott's nomination was received by the Senate on February 4, 1811. It was referred to a select committee of three members, making him the only nominee referred to a committee prior to the creation of the Senate Judiciary Committee in 1816. The committee voted on his nomination on February 13, and later that day he was referred to the Senate floor, where he was rejected by a vote of 9—24. This was despite the Democratic-Republican Party having a 28 to 6 majority in the Senate.

Wolcott's nomination was only the second to have been rejected in US history, the one prior to it being John Rutledge's rejection in 1795 as George Washington's nominee for Chief Justice. It had been rejected nine days after its receipt by the Senate. Prior to 1816, this was the longest period of deliberation by the Senate over a Supreme Court nominee, and the only one longer than seven days. After his rejection, Madison nominated John Quincy Adams, who also was approved by the Senate but turned down the appointment. The seat eventually went to Joseph Story, who became the youngest person to have sat on the Supreme Court.

== Role in the 1815–18 depression and later politics ==
After the War of 1812 and the Treaty of Ghent's ratification, the British made a policy of selling their goods at a loss. Such economic strategy harmed budding American manufacturers who might attempt to sell to the European markets. This caused a commercial depression in the United States from 1815 to 1818. In 1816, a tariff was brought in, which aided manufacturers, although some New England cotton and wool manufacturers remained discontented. The Connecticut Society for the Encouragement of Manufactures was formed during this depression. Wolcott took a leadership position, and was known as the "boss". Among its other leaders were Thomas Macdonough, Titus Hosmer, and Asher Miller, a close associate of the Governor. Its purpose was to advance manufacturers "in every legitimate way".

Wolcott led the delegation of Republicans to the convention on the Constitution of Connecticut in 1818. He sparked controversy at the convention by supporting the expulsion of any judge who declared a legislative act unconstitutional, effectively taking a position in opposition to judicial review. John Milton Niles, a colleague of Wolcott, described him after his death as someone who "more than any other individual, deserves to be considered as the father and founder of the Jeffersonian school of politics [in Connecticut]."

== Death and legacy ==
Wolcott died on June 26, 1828. He is buried in Middletown's Mortimer cemetery.
