= John Quincy Adams Supreme Court nomination =

- Nominee: John Quincy Adams
- Nominated by: James Madison (president of the United States)
- Succeeding: William Cushing (associate justice)
- Date nominated: February 21, 1811
- Date confirmed: February 22, 1811
- Outcome: Adams was confirmed by a voice vote of the U.S. Senate, but declined to take the seat

In February 1811, diplomat and politician John Quincy Adams was nominated by U.S. President James Madison and confirmed by the U.S. Senate to serve as an Associate Justice of the Supreme Court of the United States. However, upon receiving word of his appointment, Adams (who was serving as diplomat to the Russian Empire) declined the appointment. Joseph Story would later be appointed to the seat. Adams would continue to work as a diplomat and politician, and would later be elected president.

Adams' nomination came after two earlier unsuccessful attempts by Madison to fill the seat. His first nominee, Levi Lincoln Sr., had been quickly confirmed by the Senate, but declined to accept the judgeship. His second nominee, Alexander Wolcott, had his nomination overwhelmingly rejected by the Senate. Adams gave various reasons behind his decision to decline appointment, including that his wife, Louisa, was late into a pregnancy and that he could not make a timely return to the United States out of concern for the toll such a return trip might pose on a newborn's health. Overall, Adams was not comfortable accepting a judgeship, and preferred to continue his career in law and politics. After Adams declined, Madison nominated Joseph Story, who was confirmed by the Senate and accepted the judgeship.

== Background ==
In September 1810, William Cushing (an incumbent associate justice of the United States Supreme Court) died, creating a vacancy on the court. Cushing had been staunchly aligned with Federalist ideology, and had been one of the inaugural justices appointed to the court by George Washington. President James Madison consulted closely with former president Thomas Jefferson about the prospects surrounding the vacancy, believing that the vacancy presented him an opportunity to appoint a challenge that would champion the republican ideology of their Democratic-Republican Party and act as a counterweight to Chief Justice John Marshall. In the past, several judges that Jefferson and Adams had appointed, who had entered the court aligned with their ideals, as members of the court were persuaded by Marshall to adopt an ideology more aligned with him. Thus, Madison and Jefferson were keen on finding and appointing a judge who would be independent-thinking and strongly aligned with Democratic-Republicanism.

Madison and Jefferson agreed that their first-choice to fill the vacancy would be Massachusetts-based lawyer Levi Lincoln Sr. Lincoln was both well established as a Democratic-Republican and respected as a lawyer. Lincoln had sent word to Madison that he would not want to be appointed to the court. However, Madison had so wanted him, that he decided to nominate him despite these wishes in hopes that he might relent and change his disposition towards accepting an appointment. On January 2, 1811, Madison nominated Lincoln to fill the seat. He was confirmed the following by a voice vote of the United States Senate. After his confirmation, Lincoln declined to accept the seat. He cited his elderliness (62 years) and poor eyesights as reasons he could not accept.

On February 4, Madison nominated Alexander Wolcott to the seat. Wolcott, a Connecticut-based customs collector, was a staunch Democratic–Republican. Wolcott's nomination was rejected by the Senate on February 13 in a 9–24 vote.

== Nomination and confirmation of Adams ==
Following his two previous unsuccessful attempts to fill the seat, on February 11,President Madison nominated John Quincy Adams. Adams was a diplomat and the son of former president John Adams.

Adams was a member of the Democratic–Republican party. However, unlike Madison's first two nominees for the seat, Adams lacked staunch bonafides within the party. Adams was a late convert to Republicanism, and was rather weak in his embrace of it. Coming off of an embarrassing defeat in the rejection of Democratic-Republican stalwart Wolcott, Madison may have nominated Adams in recognition that his nomination would not be likely to generate controversy. He also would perhaps hope that, while on the court, Adams' nascent alignment with the Democratic–Republican movement would strengthen. He also may have recognized that Adams carried within him strong political support in the state of Massachusetts, and that there was potential that aligning Adams more firmly with the Democratic–Republican would strengthen the party's prospects in that state. He may also have hoped that as a justice Adams would have strong enough individualism to think independent from Chief Justice Marshall's influence, regardless of how deep Adams's alignment with Democratic-Republicanism was.

Adams was unanimously confirmed by the Senate on February 12, one day after he was nominated.

== Adams's declining of the seat ==
Adams was not informed of his nomination prior to confirmation, which was not entirely uncommon. After Adams was confirmed, word of his commission as associate justice was sent to him in Saint Petersburg, Russia, where he was residing while serving as the U.S. ambassador to the Russian Empire. It took three months for official notice to reach Adams, who received word on May 29. Along with notice of his appointment, he was given instructions to return to the United States at the soonest permissible moment. Additionally, he was given a letter of leave to tender to the Emperor of Russia, as well a blank commission which he could use to use to name a Secretary of Legation or Chargé d'Affaires to temporarily lead the United States Mission to Russia upon his departure.

Adams preferred to continue his career in politics and diplomacy, and believing himself to be insufficiently versed in law and too-partisan to serve as a justice. On May 30, he sent a response letter to be delivered to President Madison in which he declined the commission. In the letter, he cited his own lack of legal experience as one reason he declined. However, as the main reason he offered was the late-term pregnancy of his wife, Louisa. He noted that he intended to remain in Russia with his family until the following year, expressing concern that the long return trip from Russia would pose a health risk for a newborn. (Note: the child born of this pregnancy was a daughter, who they named Louisa. The child would tragically die in infancy of dysentery) Noting that he could not expect "an office of such important" to be left unoccupied for a year pending his return, he declared that circumstances necessitated that he decline the judgeship. Adams strongly recommended that the president instead nominate Massachusetts Federal District Court Judge John Davis to the seat in his stead.

The extended Adams family based in Quincy, Massachusetts, had been joyous at the news of the appointment. Adams' father, the president, wrote him to share their great anticipation for his return to the United States, and to argue strongly that he accept the judgeship. Adams wrote his father to explain his reasons for refusing the judgeship. In his letter to his father, he highlighted that he felt it would be unconscionable for him to render seat vacant for a year (until his return) "merely to suit my private convenience", and that he was reluctant to accept a position for which he felt there was a much better-qualified candidate (Davis). He also doubted his own suitability for the position, writing that he held a sense of his own "unfitness for a seat in judicial tribunals". His father, however, urged him to reconsider, noting that a seat on the Supreme Court would return him from Europe and place him a position that was sheltered from unpredictable politics. In response to his father, Adams wrote another letter which offered additional light on the motivations behind his rejection of the appointment. Adams wrote his father that he doubted his character was suited for a judgeship,

My own passions would allow me to stand aloof from all politics, as much as every judge ought to, the passions of others would involve me in them. If my heart is sufficiently impartial towards all of my countrymen to make me a proper umpire in their controversies, their hearts are not impartial enough to make them fit to be judged by me.

Adams also noted that he was, "deeply dissatisfied with what is called the administration of justice, both in our state and federal courts," believing that it was unfortunate that a majority of cases rendered by American courts had, in his characterization, ruled not on the question of genuine justice but rather on rules and formalities. He also expressed dismay that the American court system had so strongly incorporated English Common Law, expressing that his own views on the merits of that common law would be regarded "heretical" by the legal establishment. He noted that the common law was, "so idolized by all of the English common lawyers and by all the parrots who repeat their words in America". He noted that since he had formed his opinions on this after deep personal deliberation, and could not easily cast them aside. He also noted that in a number of occasions where he had previously expressed portions of his views he had encountered fierce public backlash, which convinced him that he needed "to be extremely cautious in future how I mingled such edged tools as those in the political controversies of the times." He argued that his views were out-of-step with popular public consensus, and he was not up to the task of changing that, exclaiming to his father,

I have not weight and influence enough in my country to bring it over to my opinions, and I have too much independence of spirit to renounce them myself. In any other than a judicial station I have no call to discuss them. There a sense of my duty would often compel me to bring them out, and if I did, you may be assured that neither my life nor the good people of America would be tranquilized by it.

Adams's strong doubts about the virtues common law is notable. His father was a well-respected common law attorney, who had centered many of his arguments in asserting the rights of American colonists against the British government on the common law.

Adams's doubts about the common law were also usual because he did not fit the ideological profile of most common law critics. In the early 19th century, opposition to the common law was most pronounced among stalwarts of the Democratic–Republican movement, as well as other movements that descended from Anti-Federalist (such as Jeffersonians). Such stalwarts commonly disliked the English Common Law and admired the French civil due to their anti-British and francophile sentiments. Such Republican stalwarts also often complained that the complexities of the common law made it inaccessible to the common man, creating an elitist legal system in which lawyers educated in the common law could abuse the laymen. Adams, however, was tepid and nascent in his alignment with the Democratic–Republican party. He also was a strong anglophile and not francophile. He also did not personally hold the same virtues related to egalitarianism. It is unclear how his critical outlook on the common law developed. It may have arose out of his frustration as a law student, having found the common law difficult to personally comprehend. The doubts he expressed about his suitability to be a practitioner of law may perhaps have been rightly-founded. His opposition may also have arose because his significant European travels and reading may have exposed him to the virtues that civil law offered over common law.

In a letter to his youngest brother, THomas, Adams expressed concern that he was too politically minded to be of suitable temperament to serve as a judge, writing,

I always shall be too much of a political partisan to be a judge...and although I know as well as any many in America how and when to lay the partisan aside, I do not wish to be called often and so completely to do it as my own sense of duty would [require] were I seated upon the bench.

Out of the (as of 2025) 129 individuals that have been confirmed by the Senate to the Supreme Court, Adams is one of only seven who declined to serve.

== Aftermath ==
After Adams declined the seat, Madison made the fourth nomination in his effort to fill Cushing's former seat on November 15, 1811, when he nominated Joseph Story. The same day, he also nominated Gabriel Duvall to fill another associate justice seat that had been left vacant by Samuel Chase's death in June. On November 18, the Senate confirmed both nominees, who each accepted the judgeships. Madison does not seen to have given any serious consideration to Adams's strong recommendation that he nominate Davis.

Adams would later serve as president of the United States. He is the first of only two United States presidents to have at one point been nominated or confirmed to serve as a justice on the Supreme Court of the United States, with the other being William Howard Taft (who served as the court's Chief Justice subsequent to his presidency).
