= Alexander Wolcott Supreme Court nomination =

1881 failed nomination by President Madison

- Nominee: Alexander Wolcott
- Nominated by: James Madison (president of the United States)
- Succeeding: William Cushing (associate justice)
- Date nominated: February 4, 1811
- Date confirmed: February 13, 1811
- Outcome: nomination rejected by the U.S. Senate

Select committee
- Result: reported to Senate

Senate vote
- Votes in favor: 9
- Votes against: 24
- Result: nomination defeated

On February 4, 1811, Alexander Wolcott was nominated by U.S. President James Madison to serve as an Associate Justice of the Supreme Court of the United States. Wolcott's nomination was met with broad criticism, due to his lack of qualifying legal experience, as well as his highly partisan background, and his enforcement of the Embargo Act of 1807 and Non-Intercourse Act of 1809 as a customs collector. The nomination faced an unprecedented review by a select committee, and was considered for an unprecedentedly-lengthy period of nine days before being voted on by the Senate. Despite Madison's Democratic–Republican Party holding a supermajority in the Senate, the nomination was overwhelmingly defeated in a 9–24 vote on confirmation.

Wolcott's nomination was the second of three unsuccessful attempts by Madison to fill the vacancy left by the death of Associate Justice William Cushing. Levi Lincoln Sr. had earlier declined to accept the judgeship, after having been confirmed unanimously by the Senate. After Wolcott's defeat, Madison nominated John Quincy Adams, whose nomination was unanimously confirmed. Like Lincoln, Adams also declined to accept the judgeship. Madison succeeded on his fourth attempt to fill the seat, appointing Joseph Story.

== Background ==
=== Earlier court nominations ===
In the early decades of the Supreme Court of the United States, nominations were routinely quickly confirmed with brief (if any) deliberation, often being confirmed by the United States Senate by voice vote. which was rejected due to concerns surrounding Rutledge's mental health and rumored alcohol abuse.

=== Cushing vacancy ===
In September 1810, William Cushing (an incumbent associate justice of the United States Supreme Court) died, creating a vacancy on the court. Cushing had been staunchly aligned with Federalist ideology, and had been one of the inaugural justices appointed to the court by George Washington. President James Madison consulted closely with former president Thomas Jefferson about the prospects surrounding the vacancy, believing that the vacancy presented him an opportunity to appoint a challenge that would champion the republican ideology of their Democratic-Republican Party and act as a counterweight to Chief Justice John Marshall. In the past, several judges that Jefferson and Adams had appointed, who had entered the court aligned with their ideals, as members of the court were persuaded by Marshall to adopt an ideology more aligned with him. Thus, Madison and Jefferson were keen on finding and appointing a judge who would be independent-thinking and strongly aligned with Democratic-Republicanism.

Madison and Jefferson agreed that their first-choice to fill the vacancy would be Massachusetts-based lawyer Levi Lincoln Sr. Lincoln was both well established as a Democratic-Republican and respected as a lawyer. Lincoln had sent word to Madison that he would not want to be appointed to the court. However, Madison had so wanted him, that he decided to nominate him despite these wishes in hopes that he might relent and change his disposition towards accepting an appointment. On January 2, 1811, Madison nominated Lincoln to fill the seat. He was confirmed the following by a voice vote of the United States Senate. After his confirmation, Lincoln declined to accept the seat. He cited his elderliness (62 years) and poor eyesights as reasons he could not accept. Only one previous nomination had been rejected by a vote of the Senate: John Rutledge's nomination in 1795 by George Washington's to be Chief Justice.

=== Wolcott ===
Wolcott, a Connecticut-based customs collector, having been appointed a collector at Middletown, Connecticut by Jefferson in 1802. Prior to this, he had served in the Connecticut General Assembly from 1796 through 1801. He was a staunch Democratic–Republican, and was considered a political boss and the leader of the party in his state. He had also been consulted by the Jefferson administration after the 1800 presidential election about nominations.

While he was a graduate of the prestigious Yale College, and had both studied and practiced law, Wolcott lacked any remarkable ability or accomplishment in the field of law. He was best known for having, as customs collector, having strongly enforced the Embargo Act of 1807. He also strongly enforced the Non-Intercourse Act of 1809, both of which were particular unpopular with northern merchants.

== Nomination of Wolcott and reception ==
On February 4, Madison nominated Alexander Wolcott to the seat. He was selected as nominee chiefly due to his deep partisan allegiance, as he lacked any remarkable ability or accomplishment in a field of law.

Senate opposition to Wolcott's nomination also arose due to his lack of qualification. His lack of distinction in the field of law even led to many within the Democratic–Republican party to also lack enthusiasm towards his nomination. The lack of support within the Democratic–Republican Party was critical, since the party held a wide 28 to 6 supermajority in the Senate, meaning that his nomination could have been consented to by the Senate without any support from Federalist Party members. Wolcott's nomination was ultimately the first nomination rejected for concerns regarding their judicial qualifications.

The nomination attracted significant criticism. The Columbian Centinel wrote that "Even those most acquainted with modern degeneracy were astounded at his abominable nomination." One major newspaper in Washington, D.C. also shared this sentiment, similarly calling the nomination "abominable". The New-York Gazette Advertiser decried his nomination by exclaiming, "Oh degraded Country! How humiliating to the friends of moral virtue – of religion and of all that is dear to the lover of his Country!"

Levi Lincoln, Adams's previous nominee for the seat, supported Wolcott's nomination.

The Federalist Party (the opposition party to the president, as well as the minority party in the Senate) additionally opposed the nomination over various concerns tied to his politics. They opposed Wolcott's pronounced partisanship, and also expressed disdain for his enthusiastic approach as a customs collector in enforcing the embargo and non-intercourse laws. His support for those laws made his nomination unpopular with many figures from region of New England, where Wolcott himself hailed from.

== Select committee review ==
The nomination was received on February 4, and was referred to a select committee of three members, making him the only nominee referred to a committee prior to the creation of the Senate Judiciary Committee in 1816. On February 13, committee reported on the nomination without making a recommendation, advancing the matter to the full Senate for a vote that was held later that day.

== Senate vote ==
On February 13, the Senate defeated Wolcott's nomination by a vote of 9–24. Wolcott's nomination was only the second to have been rejected in US history, after only John Rutledge's rejection in 1795. It had been rejected nine days after its receipt by the Senate. Prior to 1816, this was the longest period of deliberation by the Senate over a Supreme Court nominee, and the only one longer than seven days.

Wolcott confirmation vote
February 13, 1811	Party		Total votes
February 13, 1811	Democratic-Republican	Federalist	Total votes
Yea	9	0	9
Nay	17	7	24
Absent	1	0	1
Result: Rejected
Roll call vote on the nomination: Senator / Party / State / Vote; Joseph Anderson / DR / Tennessee / Nay; James Asheton Bayard / F / Delaware / Nay; Stephen R. Bradley / DR / Vermont / Nay; Richard Brent / DR / Virginia / Yea; Alexander Campbell / DR / Ohio / Nay; Henry Clay / DR / Kentucky / Nay; John Condit / DR / New Jersey / Yea; Christopher G. Champlin / F / Rhode Island / Nay; William H. Crawford / DR / Georgia / Yea; Charles Cutts / DR / New Hampshire / Absent; Samuel W. Dana / F / Connecticut / Nay; Jesse Franklin / DR / North Carolina / Nay; John Gaillard / DR / South Carolina / Nay; Obadiah German / DR / New York / Nay; William Branch Giles / DR / Virginia / Nay; Nicholas Gilman / DR / New Hampshire / Nay; Chauncey Goodrich / F / Connecticut / Nay; Andrew Gregg / DR / Pennsylvania / Nay; Outerbridge Horsey / F / Delaware / Nay; John Lambert / DR / New Jersey / Yea; Michael Leib / DR / Pennsylvania / Nay; James Lloyd / F / Massachusetts / Nay; Elisha Mathewson / DR / Rhode Island / Yea; Timothy Pickering / F / Massachusetts / Nay; John Pope / DR / Kentucky / Yea; Philip Reed / DR / Maryland / Nay; Jonathan Robinson / DR / Vermont / Yea; John Smith / DR / New York / Yea; Samuel Smith / DR / Maryland / Nay; Charles Tait / DR / Georgia / Nay; John C. Taylor / DR / South Carolina / Yea; James Turner / DR / North Carolina / Nay; Jenkin Whiteside / DR / Tennessee / Nay; Thomas Worthington / DR / Ohio / Nay; Source:

== Aftermath ==
After the defeat of Wolcott's nomination, Madison nominated John Quincy Adams for the seat. The nomination of Adams was quickly confirmed unanimously. However, like Lincoln, Adams declined to accept the judgeship. Madison later nominated Joseph Story, who accepted the judgeship after being unanimously confirmed to it.

Wolcott later served at the Connecticut Constitutional Convention in 1818, where records show that he spoke strongly in opposition to judicial review.

In 2022, Donald C. Simmons Jr. observed, that Wolcott's failed nomination, "highlights early challenges in the judicial nomination process and the complexities of political influence in such appointments." Over the subsequent course of the 19th century, rejection of nominations would become more common. Nearly one-third of nominations made during the 19th century were rejected by the Senate.
