= Hornblower (surname) =

Hornblower is a surname. Notable people with the surname include:

- Edward Thomas Hornblower (1828–1901), American investment banker, son of Henry, partner in Hornblower & Weeks, namesake of Edward Hornblower House and Barn
- Henry Hornblower (1863–1941), American investment banker, founder of Hornblower & Weeks
- Jabez Carter Hornblower (1744–1814), English pioneering steam engineer, son of Jonathan Hornblower
- Joseph Hornblower (1696?–1762), English engineer and steam pioneer
- Joseph Coerten Hornblower (1777–1864), American lawyer and Chief Justice of the New Jersey Supreme Court
- Joseph Coerten Hornblower (architect) (1848–1908), American architect
- Josiah Hornblower (1729–1809), steam pioneer and American politician
- Jonathan Hornblower (1753–1815), Cornish engineer and inventor
- Jonathan Hornblower (born 1717) (1717–1780), English steam pioneer, father of Jonathan and Jabez Hornblower
- Lewis Hornblower (1823–1879), Liverpool architect
- Margot Hornblower (born 1950), American journalist, ex-wife of Ralph Hornblower III
- Ralph Hornblower (1891–1960), American business executive
- Ralph Hornblower III (born 1948), American lawyer and operatic tenor
- Simon Hornblower (born 1949), English classicist and professor of classics and ancient history
- William B. Hornblower (1851–1914), American jurist

== See also ==
- Justice Hornblower (disambiguation)
