= Unsuccessful nominations to the Supreme Court of the United States =

The Supreme Court of the United States is the highest-ranking judicial body in the United States. Established by Article III of the Constitution, the detailed structure of the court was laid down by the 1st United States Congress in 1789. Congress specified the Court's original and appellate jurisdiction, created 13 judicial districts, and fixed the initial size of the Supreme Court. The number of justices on the Supreme Court changed six times before settling at the present total of nine in 1869. As of June 2022, a total of 116 justices have served on the Supreme Court since 1789. Justices have life tenure, and so they serve until they die in office, resign or retire, or are impeached and removed from office.

Justices are nominated by the President of the United States and then must be confirmed by the United States Senate, before being officially appointed. A nomination to the Court is considered to be official when the Senate receives a signed nomination letter from the president naming the nominee, which is then entered in the Senate's record. There have been 37 unsuccessful nominations to the Supreme Court of the United States. Of these, 11 nominees were rejected in Senate roll-call votes, 11 were withdrawn by the president, and 15 lapsed at the end of a session of Congress. Six of these unsuccessful nominees were subsequently nominated and confirmed to seats on the Court. Additionally, although confirmed, seven nominees declined office and one died before assuming office.

== 18th century ==
=== George Washington ===
Among the six original nominees to the Supreme Court, George Washington nominated Robert H. Harrison, who declined to serve. The seat remained empty until the confirmation of James Iredell in 1790.

Washington nominated William Paterson for the Supreme Court on February 27, 1793. The nomination was withdrawn by the President the following day. Washington had realized that since the law establishing the positions within the Supreme Court had been passed during Paterson's term as a Senator (a post he had resigned in November 1790 after being elected Governor of New Jersey) the nomination was a violation of Article I, Section 6 of the Constitution. Washington re-nominated Paterson to the Court on March 4, 1793, after the expiration of what would have been Paterson's term as Senator had he not resigned, and Paterson was confirmed by the Senate.

John Jay resigned as Chief Justice on June 29, 1795, after being elected Governor of New York. The subsequent nomination of John Rutledge as Chief Justice was rejected by a vote of 10–14 on December 15, 1795. Rutledge's strident and vocal opposition to the Jay Treaty may have been the main reason for his rejection. Because he had been a recess appointment, Rutledge served as Chief Justice for one term. Washington nominated Associate Justice William Cushing to replace him as Chief Justice, but Cushing declined the role. Washington then successfully appointed Oliver Ellsworth to serve as the next Chief Justice.

=== John Adams ===
After Oliver Ellsworth decided to resign from the position of Chief Justice, President John Adams sought to replace Ellsworth with John Jay, who had been the first Chief Justice. Jay was formally nominated, but turned down the position. Adams then successfully nominated his Secretary of State, John Marshall.

== 19th century ==
=== James Madison ===
When William Cushing died, James Madison nominated Levi Lincoln Sr. on January 2, 1811. Lincoln declined the nomination. Alexander Wolcott was then nominated, but was rejected by a vote of 9–24 on February 13, 1811. After John Quincy Adams declined a nomination, Madison was finally successful in filling the seat with his appointment of Joseph Story.

=== John Quincy Adams ===
John Quincy Adams nominated John J. Crittenden on December 18, 1828. The Senate postponed the vote on his confirmation, by a vote of 23–17, on February 12, 1829. The Senate did not explicitly vote to "postpone indefinitely", but the resolution did have that effect. President Andrew Jackson instead filled the position with John McLean.

=== Andrew Jackson ===
Andrew Jackson nominated Roger B. Taney on January 15, 1835, to be an Associate Justice. A resolution was passed by a Senate vote of 24–21 on March 3, 1835, to postpone the nomination indefinitely. Jackson nominated Taney again on December 28, 1835. After the political composition of the Senate changed the next year, Taney was confirmed as Chief Justice March 15, 1836.

In 1837, Jackson nominated William Smith and John Catron to newly created seats. Both were confirmed, but Smith declined to serve. Later that year, Jackson's successor Martin Van Buren appointed John McKinley to fill the vacancy.

=== John Tyler ===
John Tyler experienced extreme difficulty in obtaining approval of his nominees due to his lack of political support in the Senate. Tyler took office in 1841 after the death of Whig President William Henry Harrison. Tyler had been Harrison's running mate in the 1840 election, but Tyler clashed with the Congressional Whigs over issues such as the national bank, and these clashes extended to judicial nominees.

John Canfield Spencer was nominated on January 9, 1844, and his nomination was defeated by a vote of 21–26 on January 31, 1844. Reuben H. Walworth was nominated on March 13, 1844, and a resolution to table the nomination passed on a 27–20 vote on June 15, 1844. The nomination was withdrawn from the Senate on June 17, 1844. Edward King was nominated on June 5, 1844. A resolution to table the nomination passed by a vote of 29–18 on June 15, 1844. No other action was taken on this nomination.

The same day that Walworth's nomination was withdrawn, Spencer was re-submitted, but there is no record of debate and a letter from the President withdrawing the nomination was received on the same day. Walworth was then re-nominated later that same day, but the motion to act on the nomination in the Senate was objected to, and no further action was taken.

Walworth and King were re-nominated on December 10, 1844, but both nominations were tabled on January 21, 1845. Walworth's nomination was withdrawn on February 6, 1845, and King's two days later. John M. Read was nominated on February 8, 1845, and there was a motion to consider the nomination in the Senate on January 21, 1845, but the motion was unsuccessful and no other action was taken. On February 14, 1845, the Senate voted to confirm Samuel Nelson.

=== James K. Polk ===
After Henry Baldwin's death in 1844, James K. Polk nominated James Buchanan, who declined the nomination. Polk then nominated George W. Woodward, but the Senate rejected him by a vote of 20–29. Baldwin was finally replaced by Robert Cooper Grier in 1846.

=== Millard Fillmore ===
Millard Fillmore, the last member of the Whig Party to serve as president, made three nominations to replace John McKinley, nominating Edward A. Bradford, George Edmund Badger, and William C. Micou, but the Senate, controlled by the Democratic Party, did not take action on any of the nominees. Democratic President Franklin Pierce filled the vacancy with John Archibald Campbell.

=== James Buchanan ===
James Buchanan nominated Jeremiah S. Black to the court in early February 1861 to replace Peter Vivian Daniel. A motion to bring the nomination up for discussion was defeated 25–26 on February 21, 1861. His successor, Abraham Lincoln, filled the seat with Samuel Freeman Miller in 1862.

=== Andrew Johnson ===
Andrew Johnson took office after the death of Republican Abraham Lincoln in 1865. Johnson, a former Democrat, had been Lincoln's running mate on the National Union ticket of 1864, but Johnson disagreed with Congressional Republicans on several issues, including judicial nominees.

Two justices died in office during Johnson's administration, James Moore Wayne and John Catron. Johnson had, in April 1866, nominated Henry Stanbery to be an Associate Justice. The following July, however, Congress passed the Judicial Circuits Act of 1866, which provided for a gradual elimination of seats until only seven were left. Due to the reduction of seats, Stanbery's nomination was nullified. Chief Justice Salmon P. Chase had urged for this reduction in the hopes that it would result in an increase of the justices' salaries, which, ironically, did not happen until Congress restored the size of the court to nine members in 1871.

=== Ulysses S. Grant ===
Ulysses S. Grant nominated Ebenezer R. Hoar to a new seat on the court. The Senate rejected this nomination by a vote of 24–33. Grant successfully nominated Joseph Bradley for the seat.

Grant also nominated Edwin M. Stanton, former Attorney General and Secretary of War to the court. The nomination was eventually confirmed, but Stanton died before he was commissioned. Grant then successfully nominated William Strong.

Grant nominated George Henry Williams to be Chief Justice of the United States in 1873, but he later withdrew from consideration. Prior to withdrawal of consideration, the Senate Judiciary Committee declined to recommend confirmation to the entire Senate. Grant then nominated Caleb Cushing for Chief Justice on January 9, 1874, but despite Cushing's great learning and eminence at the bar, his anti-war record and the feeling of distrust experienced by many members of the U.S. Senate on account of his inconsistency, aroused such vigorous opposition that his nomination was withdrawn on January 13, 1874. Grant was successful with his third nomination of Morrison Waite.

=== Rutherford B. Hayes ===
Early in 1881, President Rutherford B. Hayes nominated Thomas Stanley Matthews for the position of Associate Justice. Matthews was a controversial nominee due to his close ties to the railroad industry, and as the nomination came near the end of Hayes's term, the Senate did not act on it. However, upon succeeding Hayes, incoming President James A. Garfield (who, like Hayes, was a Republican) renominated Matthews, and the Senate confirmed him by a vote of 24 to 23, the narrowest confirmation for a successful U.S. Supreme Court nominee in history. He served on the Court until his death in 1889.

=== Chester A. Arthur ===
In 1882, Chester A. Arthur nominated Roscoe Conkling to serve as an Associate Justice after Ward Hunt resigned. Conkling was confirmed, and then declined the position.

After Conkling declined, Arthur nominated George F. Edmunds, who twice declined to serve. Arthur then nominated Samuel Blatchford, who was confirmed and accepted.

=== Grover Cleveland ===
Associate Justice Samuel Blatchford died in 1893, during the second term of Grover Cleveland. This seat was traditionally held by a New Yorker. Cleveland's first two nominees were not confirmed by the Senate; the nomination of William Hornblower was rejected by the Senate by a vote of 24–30 on January 15, 1894. Cleveland's follow-up nominee Wheeler Hazard Peckham was also rejected by the Senate, 32–41, on February 16, 1894.

By the tradition of Senatorial courtesy, other Senators generally deferred to a nominee's home state senators when evaluating a presidential nomination. The Senators from New York were Edward Murphy Jr. and David B. Hill; Hill objected to Cleveland's nominations, and most other Senators supported Hill. Hill was a rival of Cleveland's who had lost the Democratic nomination for President to him in 1892.

Cleveland finally overcame Hill's opposition by nominating Edward Douglass White of Louisiana. White was a sitting Senator, and Senatorial courtesy dictated that the Senate not reject one of its own. White's nomination was approved; he served as an Associate Justice until 1910, and as Chief Justice until his death in 1921.

== 20th century ==
=== Warren Harding ===
President Warren G. Harding nominated Pierce Butler to the Supreme Court in 1922, but the Senate refused to consider his nomination, in part due to Butler's advocacy for railroad interests. However, Harding re-submitted the nomination later in the year, and Butler was confirmed in a 61–8 vote.

=== Herbert Hoover ===
On May 7, 1930, Herbert Hoover's nomination of Appellate Judge John J. Parker for the Supreme Court was rejected by a vote of 39–41. Parker was nominated to replace Edward Terry Sanford. The American Federation of Labor opposed Parker for his rulings that were favorable towards yellow dog contracts and the NAACP opposed Parker due to concerns about Parker's racial views. Hoover attempted to appeal to Southern Democratic senators to vote for Parker, who was from North Carolina, but Hoover was unable to win enough Democratic votes to make up for Republican defections. Hoover's second nominee, Owen J. Roberts, was confirmed by the Senate.

=== Dwight D. Eisenhower ===
President Dwight D. Eisenhower nominated John Marshall Harlan II in 1954, but his nomination was not reported out of the judiciary committee, in part due to opposition to his purported "ultra-liberal" views. Eisenhower re-nominated Harlan in 1955, and the Senate confirmed him in a 71–11 vote.

=== Lyndon B. Johnson ===
Lyndon B. Johnson nominated Abe Fortas, then an associate justice, for Chief Justice. Fortas would have succeeded Earl Warren, who had decided to retire. Controversy ensued regarding Fortas's extrajudicial activities, and at Fortas's request, Johnson withdrew the nomination prior to a vote of the full Senate. Fortas's nomination was also opposed by many senators who opposed the rulings of the Warren Court, especially Miranda v. Arizona. Fortas's nomination was also injured after Johnson withdrew from the 1968 presidential election, leaving himself as a lame duck. President Nixon instead filled the vacancy caused by Warren's retirement with Warren Burger.

When Johnson nominated Fortas, he also nominated Homer Thornberry to fill Fortas' seat. Since Fortas withdrew his name from the Chief Justice nomination, but maintained his seat as an Associate Justice (with Earl Warren continuing as Chief Justice), the nomination of Thornberry was void. He was never voted on by the Senate.

=== Richard Nixon ===
After the Republicans scuttled Fortas's nomination as Supreme Court Chief Justice, Democrats retaliated by interfering with Nixon's plans to nominate a Southern conservative justice as part of the Republican Party's Southern Strategy. When Abe Fortas resigned in 1969 because of a scandal separate from his Chief Justice bid, Richard Nixon nominated Clement Haynsworth, a Southern jurist. His nomination was rejected by the Senate by a vote of 45–55 on November 21, 1969, due to concerns about Haynsworth's civil rights record and perceived ethical lapses. In response, Nixon nominated G. Harrold Carswell, a Floridian with a history of supporting segregation and opposing women's rights. The Senate rejected his nomination 45 to 51 on April 8, 1970, following much pressure from the Civil Rights and Feminist movements. Nixon's third nominee for the Fortas vacancy was Harry Blackmun, who was confirmed by the Senate with no opposition on May 17, 1970.

Nixon was soon faced with two more Supreme Court vacancies when John Harlan and Hugo Black retired in the fall of 1971. Nixon considered nominating Arkansas lawyer Hershel Friday and California intermediate appellate judge Mildred Lillie to the high court. By tradition at the time, potential Supreme Court nominees were first disclosed to the American Bar Association's standing committee on the federal judiciary. When it became apparent that this 12-member committee would find that both were unqualified, Nixon passed over Friday and Lillie, and nominated Lewis Powell and William Rehnquist. Powell was confirmed by an 89–1 vote, and Rehnquist was confirmed 68–26.

=== Ronald Reagan ===
When Lewis Powell retired in July 1987, Ronald Reagan nominated Robert Bork. Bork was a member of the Court of Appeals for the District of Columbia at the time and known as a proponent of constitutional originalism. Bork lost confirmation by a Senate vote of 42 to 58, largely due to Bork's conservative opinions on constitutional issues and his role in the Nixon Saturday Night Massacre.

Reagan then announced his intention to nominate Douglas H. Ginsburg to the court. Before Ginsburg could be officially nominated, he withdrew himself from consideration under heavy pressure after revealing that he had smoked marijuana with his students while a professor at Harvard Law School. Reagan then nominated Anthony Kennedy, who was confirmed by a Senate vote of 97–0.

== 21st century ==
=== George W. Bush ===
In October 2005, George W. Bush nominated Harriet Miers, a corporate attorney from Texas who had served as Bush's private attorney and as White House Counsel, as an Associate Justice to replace retiring Justice Sandra Day O'Connor. Miers was widely perceived as unqualified for the position, and it later emerged that she had allowed her law license to lapse for a time. The nomination was immediately attacked by politicians and commentators from across the political spectrum. At Miers's request, Bush withdrew the nomination on October 27, ostensibly to avoid violating executive privilege by disclosing details of her work at the White House. Four days later, Bush nominated Samuel Alito to the seat, who was confirmed by a vote of 58–42 on January 31, 2006.

=== Barack Obama ===
In February 2016, Associate Justice Antonin Scalia died. The following month, President Barack Obama nominated D.C. circuit judge Merrick Garland to replace Scalia. However, the Senate was controlled by the Republican Party, which argued that the next president should instead appoint Scalia's successor. Senate Republicans refused to hold hearings on Garland, and Garland's nomination remained before the Senate longer than any other Supreme Court nomination. Garland's nomination expired with the end of the 114th United States Congress.

The vacancy caused by Scalia's death remained unfilled for 422 days, making it just the second Supreme Court vacancy since the end of the American Civil War to remain unfilled for more than one year. On January 31, 2017, President Donald Trump, who succeeded Obama, nominated federal appeals court judge Neil Gorsuch to replace Justice Scalia. Justice Gorsuch was sworn in on April 10, 2017, after being confirmed by a vote of 54–45.

In 2021, Merrick Garland was nominated by President Joe Biden (who served as vice president under Barack Obama) for the position of United States attorney general. He was confirmed by a Senate vote of 70–30, and served in the role until Biden left office in 2025.

== List of unsuccessful nominations ==
Following is a list of the 31 unsuccessful Supreme Court nominations.

Unsuccessful Supreme Court nominations
Nominee	Year	Nominated by	Outcome
John Rutledge (Note: Nominee was the incumbent chief justice, serving under a recess appointment.)	1795	Washington	Rejected, 10–14
Alexander Wolcott	1811	Madison	Rejected, 9–24
John J. Crittenden	1828	J. Q. Adams	Lapsed
John C. Spencer	1844	Tyler	Rejected, 21–26
Reuben H. Walworth	1844	Tyler	Withdrawn
Edward King	1844	Tyler	Lapsed
John C. Spencer	1844	Tyler	Withdrawn
Reuben H. Walworth	1844	Tyler	Lapsed
Reuben H. Walworth	1844	Tyler	Withdrawn
Edward King	1844	Tyler	Withdrawn
John M. Read	1845	Tyler	Lapsed
George W. Woodward	1845	Polk	Rejected, 20–29
Edward A. Bradford	1852	Fillmore	Lapsed
George E. Badger	1853	Fillmore	Lapsed
William C. Micou	1853	Fillmore	Lapsed
Jeremiah S. Black	1861	Buchanan	Lapsed
Henry Stanbery	1866	A. Johnson	Lapsed
Ebenezer R. Hoar	1869	Grant	Rejected, 24–33
George Henry Williams	1873	Grant	Withdrawn
Caleb Cushing	1874	Grant	Withdrawn
William B. Hornblower	1893	Cleveland	Lapsed
William B. Hornblower	1893	Cleveland	Rejected, 24–30
Wheeler Hazard Peckham	1894	Cleveland	Rejected, 32–41
John J. Parker	1930	Hoover	Rejected, 39–41
Abe Fortas (Note: Nominee was an incumbent associate justice nominated for chief justice.)	1968	L. B. Johnson	Withdrawn
Homer Thornberry	1968	L. B. Johnson	Withdrawn
Clement Haynsworth	1969	Nixon	Rejected, 45–55
G. Harrold Carswell	1970	Nixon	Rejected, 45–51
Robert Bork	1987	Reagan	Rejected, 42–58
Harriet Miers	2005	G. W. Bush	Withdrawn
Merrick Garland	2016	Obama	Lapsed

Six Supreme Court nominees were neither confirmed nor rejected immediately, but were re-nominated within months of their first nomination and then confirmed to a position on the Court:

Supreme Court nominees confirmed after second nomination
Nominee	Dates of nominations	Nominated by	Outcome
William Paterson	Feb. and March, 1793	Washington	First nomination withdrawn due to ineligibility as sitting senator, re-nominated after end of Paterson's Senate term
Roger B. Taney	Jan. and July, 1835	Jackson	nominated shortly before end of session; re-nominated as Chief Justice in new Congress
Stanley Matthews	Jan. and March, 1881	Hayes/Garfield	nominated shortly before end of session; re-nominated in new Congress
Pierce Butler	Nov. and Dec. 1922	Harding	nominated twice and confirmed within a month
John Marshall Harlan II	Nov., 1954 and Jan., 1955	Eisenhower	nominated shortly before end of session; renominated in new Congress
John Roberts	July and Sept., 2005	G. W. Bush	nomination as Associate Justice withdrawn due to renomination as Chief Justice

Following is a list of the eight confirmed supreme Court nominees who never served on the Court.

Confirmed Supreme Court nominees who did not serve
Nominee	Year	Nominated by	Reason
Robert H. Harrison	1789	Washington	Declined
William Cushing	1796	Washington	Declined
John Jay	1800	J. Adams	Declined
Levi Lincoln Sr.	1811	Madison	Declined
John Quincy Adams	1811	Madison	Declined
William Smith	1837	Jackson	Declined
Edwin Stanton	1869	Grant	Died
Roscoe Conkling	1882	Arthur	Declined

== See also ==
- List of nominations to the Supreme Court of the United States
- Thurmond rule
- Unsuccessful nominations to the Cabinet of the United States
