= Justice Hornblower =

Justice Hornblower or Judge Hornblower or variant, may refer to:

- Joseph Coerten Hornblower (1777–1864), chief justice of the New Jersey Supreme Court
- William B. Hornblower (1851–1914), judge of the New York Court of Appeals

== See also ==
- Hornblower (surname)
- Hornblower (disambiguation)
