= Presidency of Millard Fillmore =

U.S. presidential administration from 1850 to 1853

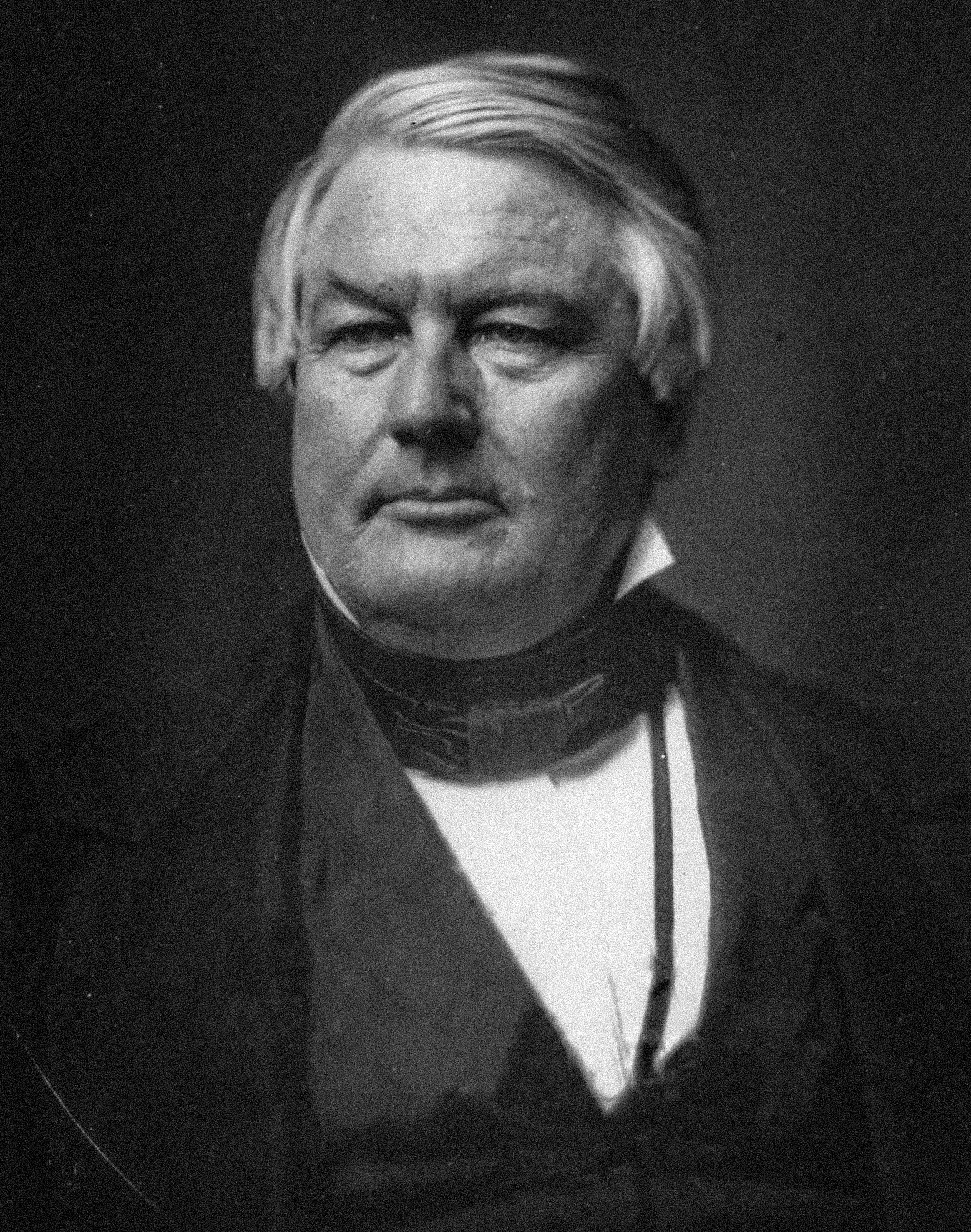
- Portrait, c. 1855–1860
- Presidency of Millard Fillmore; July 9, 1850 – March 4, 1853
- Vice President: None (Note: Fillmore was vice president under President Zachary Taylor and became president upon Taylor's death on July 9, 1850. Prior to adoption of the Twenty-fifth Amendment (1967) a vacancy in the office of vice president was not filled until the next ensuing election and inauguration.)
- Cabinet: See list
- Party: Whig
- Seat: White House
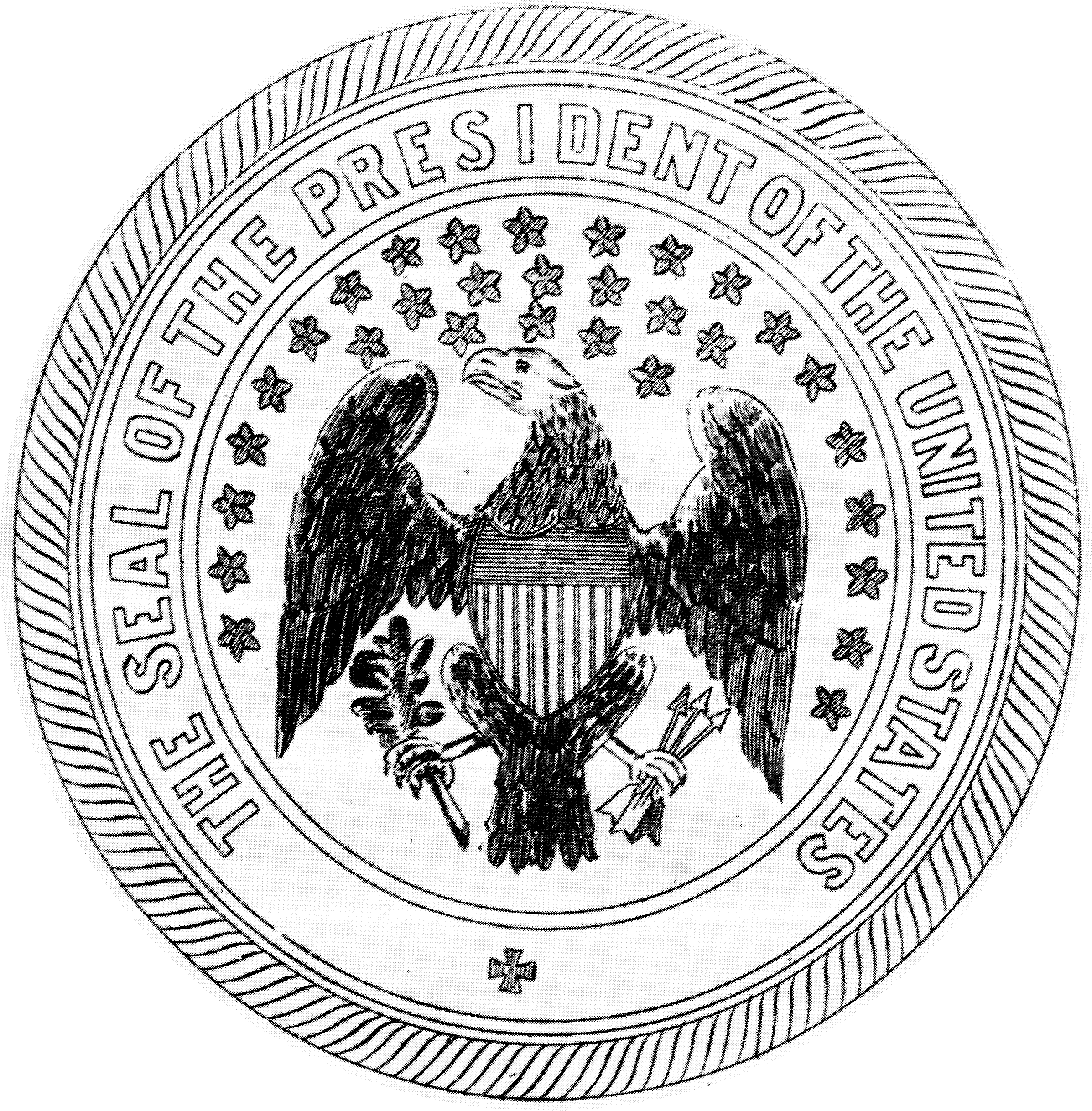
- Seal of the president (1850–1894)

Millard Fillmore's tenure as the 13th president of the United States began on July 9, 1850, upon the death of President Zachary Taylor, and ended on March 4, 1853. Fillmore, the last Whig president, had been vice president under Taylor prior to succeeding the presidency. He was the second president to succeed to the office without being elected to it, after John Tyler. He lost the Whig presidential nomination at the 1852 Whig National Convention. Fillmore was succeeded by Democrat Franklin Pierce.

Upon taking office, Fillmore dismissed Taylor's cabinet and pursued a new policy with regard to the territory acquired in the Mexican–American War. He supported the efforts of Senators Henry Clay and Stephen A. Douglas, who crafted and passed the Compromise of 1850. The Compromise of 1850 temporarily settled the status of slavery in the lands acquired as result of the Mexican–American War, and led to a brief truce in the escalating political battle between slave and free states. A controversial part of the Compromise was the Fugitive Slave Act, which expedited the return of escaped slaves to those who claimed ownership. Fillmore felt himself duty-bound to enforce it, but his support of the policy damaged his popularity and split both the Whig Party and the nation. In foreign policy, Fillmore launched the Perry Expedition to open trade in Japan, moved to block the French annexation of Hawaii, and reduced tensions with Spain in the aftermath of Narciso López's filibuster expeditions to Cuba.

Fillmore somewhat reluctantly sought his party's nomination for a full term, but the split between supporters of Fillmore and Secretary of State Daniel Webster led to the nomination of General Winfield Scott at the 1852 Whig National Convention. Pierce defeated Scott by a wide margin in the general election. Though some analysts praise various aspects of it, Fillmore's presidency is generally ranked as among the worst in polls of historians and political scientists.

== Accession ==
The 1848 Whig National Convention selected Zachary Taylor, a top American general during the Mexican–American War, as the Whig presidential nominee. For Taylor's running mate, John A. Collier convinced his fellow Whigs to nominate Fillmore, a loyal supporter of defeated presidential candidate Henry Clay. During the 1848 presidential election, Fillmore campaigned for the Whig ticket, and he helped put an end to a brief anti-Taylor movement among Northern Whigs that had emerged after Taylor accepted the nomination of a small, breakaway group of pro-slavery Democrats. With the Democrats divided by the Free Soil candidacy of former President Martin Van Buren, the Whigs won the 1848 presidential election.

Despite the Whig presidential victory, Democrats maintained control of both the House of Representatives and the Senate, preventing the reversal of outgoing President James K. Polk's policies on the tariff and other issues. Taylor's presidency instead centered the status of slavery in the region ceded by Mexico following the Mexican–American War. After taking office, Vice President Fillmore was quickly sidelined by the efforts of editor Thurlow Weed, who viewed Fillmore as a rival to Weed's close political ally, William H. Seward. Fillmore was unhappy during his vice presidency, partly because his wife, Abigail Fillmore, spent much of her time at their home in New York.

Fillmore received the formal notification of Zachary Taylor's death, signed by the cabinet, on the evening of July 9, 1850 in his residence at the Willard Hotel. Fillmore had spent the previous night in a vigil with the cabinet outside of Taylor's White House bedroom. After acknowledging the letter, Fillmore went to the House of Representatives Chamber in the U.S. Capitol the following day, where he took the presidential oath of office. William Cranch, chief judge of the U.S. Circuit Court, administered the oath to Fillmore. In contrast to John Tyler, whose legitimacy as president had been questioned by many after his accession to the presidency in 1841, Fillmore was widely accepted as the president by members of Congress and the public.

Taylor's widow, Margaret Taylor, left Washington soon after her husband's death, and Fillmore's family took up residence in the White House shortly thereafter. Because Fillmore's wife, Abigail, was often in poor health, his daughter, Mary Abigail Fillmore, frequently served as the White House hostess.

== Administration ==
Fillmore cabinet
Office	Name	Term
President	Millard Fillmore	1850–1853
Vice President	none	1850–1853
Secretary of State	John M. Clayton	1850
Daniel Webster	1850–1852
Edward Everett	1852–1853
Secretary of the Treasury	William M. Meredith	1850
Thomas Corwin	1850–1853
Secretary of War	George W. Crawford	1850
Charles Magill Conrad	1850–1853
Attorney General	Reverdy Johnson	1850
John J. Crittenden	1850–1853
Postmaster General	Jacob Collamer	1850
Nathan K. Hall	1850–1852
Samuel Dickinson Hubbard	1852–1853
Secretary of the Navy	William Ballard Preston	1850
William Alexander Graham	1850–1852
John P. Kennedy	1852–1853
Secretary of the Interior	Thomas Ewing	1850
Thomas McKennan	1850
Alexander Stuart	1850–1853

Taylor's cabinet appointees submitted their resignation on July 10, and Fillmore accepted the resignations the following day. Fillmore is the only president who succeeded by death or resignation not to retain, at least initially, his predecessor's cabinet. The biggest challenge facing Taylor had been the issue of slavery in the territories, and this issue immediately confronted the Fillmore administration as well. Taylor had opposed a plan, formulated by Henry Clay, which was designed to appeal to both anti-slavery northerners and pro-slavery southerners, but which received the most support from Southerners. During his vice presidency, Fillmore had indicated that he might vote to support the compromise, but he had not publicly committed himself on the issue when he assumed the presidency.

Fillmore hoped to use the process of selecting the cabinet to re-unify the Whig Party, and he sought to balance the cabinet among North and South, pro-compromise and anti-compromise, and pro-Taylor and anti-Taylor. Fillmore offered the position of Secretary of State to Robert Charles Winthrop, an anti-compromise Massachusetts Whig who was widely popular among Whigs in the House of Representatives, but Winthrop declined the post. Fillmore instead chose Daniel Webster, who had previously served as Secretary of State under William Henry Harrison and John Tyler. Webster had outraged his Massachusetts constituents by supporting the compromise, and he was unlikely to win election another term in the Senate in 1851. Webster became Fillmore's most important adviser. Two other prominent Whig Senators, Thomas Corwin of Ohio and John J. Crittenden of Kentucky, also joined Fillmore's cabinet. Fillmore appointed his old law partner, Nathan Hall, as Postmaster General, a cabinet position that controlled many patronage appointments. Charles Magill Conrad of Louisiana became the Secretary of War, William Alexander Graham of North Carolina became Secretary of the Navy, and Alexander Hugh Holmes Stuart of Virginia became Secretary of the Interior. Though Fillmore's cabinet appointments were warmly received by both Northern and Southern Whigs, party unity was shattered soon after Fillmore's accession due to the fight over Clay's compromise.

== Judicial appointments ==
Fillmore appointed one Supreme Court justice, though two Supreme Court vacancies arose during his presidency. The first vacancy arose due to the death of Associate Justice Levi Woodbury in 1851. Determined to nominate a Whig from New England, Fillmore settled on Benjamin Robbins Curtis. The 41-year-old Curtis had earned notoriety as a leading practitioner of commercial law, and he won the full backing of Secretary of State Webster. Despite some opposition from anti-slavery senators, Curtis ultimately won Senate approval. After the death of Associate Justice John McKinley in mid-1852, Fillmore successively nominated Edward A. Bradford, George Edmund Badger, and William C. Micou. By refusing to act on any of the nominations, Senate Democrats ensured that the vacancy would be filled by Franklin Pierce after Fillmore left office. Curtis would serve on the Supreme Court until 1857, when he resigned in protest of the holding in Dred Scott v. Sandford. Fillmore also made four appointments to United States district courts, including that of his Postmaster General, Nathan Hall, to the federal district court in Buffalo.

== Domestic affairs ==
=== Compromise of 1850 ===
==== Background ====
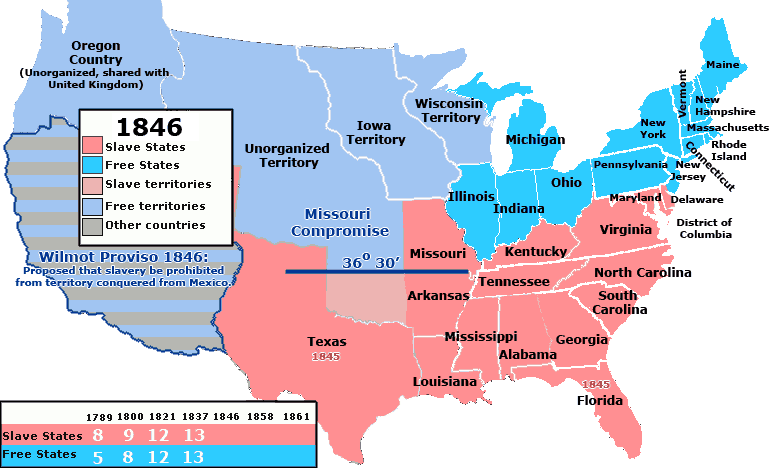
The slave states and free states in 1846, before the Treaty of Guadalupe Hidalgo and the partition of Oregon.

Before and during Taylor's presidency, a crisis had developed over the land acquired after the Mexican–American War in the Treaty of Guadalupe Hidalgo. The key issue was the status of slavery in the territories, which, for many leaders, represented a debate over not just slavery but also morality, property rights, and personal honor. Southern extremists like John C. Calhoun viewed any limit on slavery as an attack on the Southern way of life, while many Northerners opposed any further expansion of slavery. Further complicating the issue was that much of the newly acquired Western lands seemed unsuitable to slavery due to climate and geography. In 1820, Congress had agreed to the Missouri Compromise, which had banned slavery in all lands of the Louisiana Purchase north of the 36° 30' parallel, and many Southerners sought to extend this line to the Pacific Ocean. During the Mexican–American War, a Northern member of Congress had put forth the Wilmot Proviso, a legislative proposal that would have banned slavery in all territories acquired in the Mexican–American War. Though not adopted by Congress, the debate over the Wilmot Proviso had contributed to an increasingly tense national debate regarding slavery.

The territorial issues centered on the territories of California and New Mexico, as well the state of Texas, which had been annexed in 1845. Because California lacked an organized territorial government, the federal government faced difficulties in providing adequate governance in the midst of the California Gold Rush, and many sought immediate statehood for California. After the start of the gold rush, hundreds of slaves were imported into California to work the gold mines, provoking a harsh reaction from competing miners. With the approval of military governor Bennet C. Riley, in 1849 Californians held a constitutional convention. In anticipation of imminent statehood, the convention wrote a new constitution that would ban slavery in California. Meanwhile, Texas claimed all of the Mexican Cession east of the Rio Grande, including parts of the former Mexican state of New Mexico that it had never exercised de facto control over. Texan leaders had expected to be granted control of all territory east of the Rio Grande after the Mexican-American War, but the inhabitants of New Mexico had resisted Texan control. New Mexico had long prohibited slavery, a fact that affected the debate over its territorial status, but many New Mexican leaders opposed joining Texas primarily because Texas's capital lay hundreds of miles away and because Texas and New Mexico had a history of conflict dating back to the 1841 Santa Fe Expedition. Outside of Texas, many Southern leaders supported Texas's claims to New Mexico in order to secure as much territory as possible for the expansion of slavery. President Taylor had opposed Texas's ambitions in New Mexico, and he favored quickly granting statehood to both California and New Mexico in order to avoid reigniting the debate over the Wilmot Proviso.

Congress also faced the issue of Utah, which like California and New Mexico, had been ceded by Mexico. Utah was inhabited largely by Mormons, whose practice of polygamy was unpopular in the United States. Aside from the disposition of the territories, other issues had risen to prominence during the Taylor years. The Washington, D.C. slave trade angered many in the North, who viewed the presence of slavery in the capital as a blemish on the nation. Disputes around fugitive slaves had grown since 1830 in part due to improving means of transportation, as escaped slaves used roads, railroads, and ships to escape. The Fugitive Slave Act of 1793 had granted jurisdiction to all state and federal judges over cases regarding fugitive slaves, but several Northern states, dissatisfied by the lack of due process in these cases, had passed personal liberty laws that made it more difficult to return alleged fugitive slaves to the South. Another issue that would affect the compromise was Texas's debt; it had approximately $10 million in debt left over from its time as an independent nation, and that debt would become a factor in the debates over the territories.

==== Taylor presidency ====
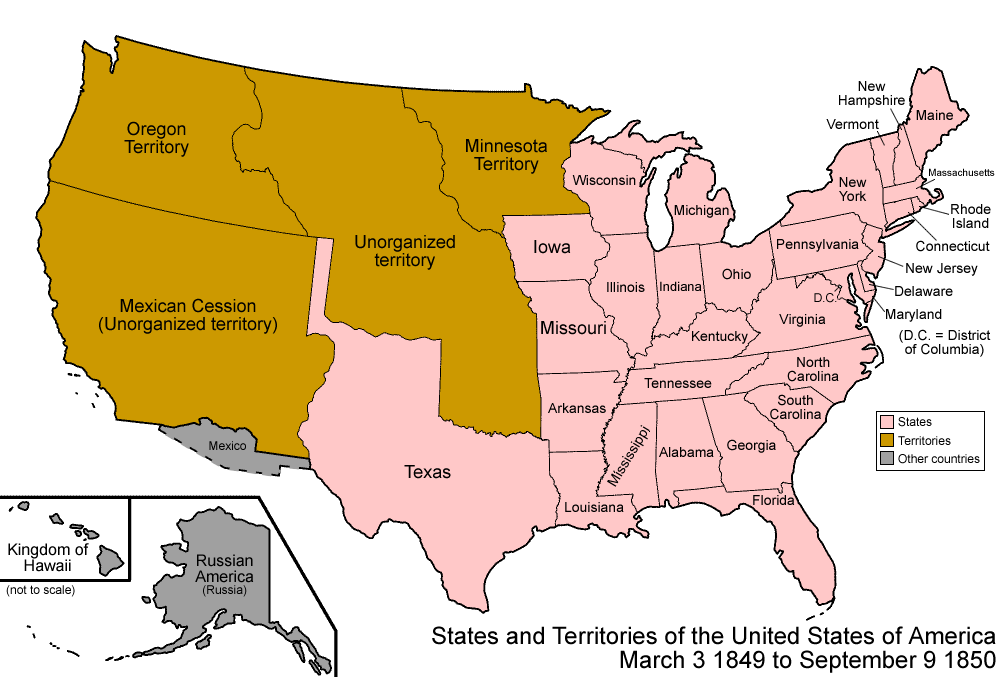
The United States at the start of Fillmore's presidency, with Texas's land claims on New Mexico shown. Much of the Mexican Cession remained unorganized.

On January 29, 1850, Senator Henry Clay introduced a plan which combined the major subjects under discussion. His legislative package included the admission of California as a free state, the cession by Texas of some of its northern and western territorial claims in return for debt relief, the establishment of New Mexico and Utah territories, a ban on the importation of slaves into the District of Columbia for sale, and a more stringent fugitive slave law. In the final months of his life, Senator Calhoun attempted to rally Southerners against the compromise, arguing that it was biased against the South because it would lead to the creation of new free states. Anti-slavery Northerners like William Seward and Salmon Chase also opposed the compromise. Clay's proposal did, however, win the backing of many Southern and Northern leaders, many of whom attacked opponents of the compromise as extremists. Fillmore, who presided over the Senate in his role as vice president, privately came to support Clay's position.

Though Clay had originally favored voting on each of his proposals separately, Senator Henry S. Foote of Mississippi convinced him to combine the proposals regarding California's admission and the disposition of Texas's borders into one bill. Clay hoped that this combination of measures would convince congressmen from both North and South to support the overall package of laws even if they objected to specific provisions. Clay's proposal attracted the support of some Northern Democrats and Southern Whigs, but it lacked the backing necessary to win passage, and debate over the bill continued. Foote and other Southern leaders attempted to condition California's statehood either on granting Texas the full extent of its boundary claims on New Mexico, or on the requirement that slavery be allowed in the disputed region if it was not awarded to Texas. Foote also sought to split California into two states, with the division at the 35th parallel north. Taylor opposed the bill, since he favored granting California statehood immediately and denied the legitimacy of Texas's claims over New Mexico. While Congress continued to debate Clay's proposals, Texas Governor Peter Hansborough Bell loudly protested the organization of New Mexico's constitutional convention, which had been proceeded with the approval of Taylor and the military government of New Mexico instigated by General Stephen W. Kearny during the Mexican–American War. Following the New Mexico constitutional convention, Taylor urged that Congress immediately grant statehood to both California and New Mexico, and he prepared for a clash with Texas. When Taylor died in July 1850, none of the major domestic issues facing his presidency had been settled.

==== Compromise ====
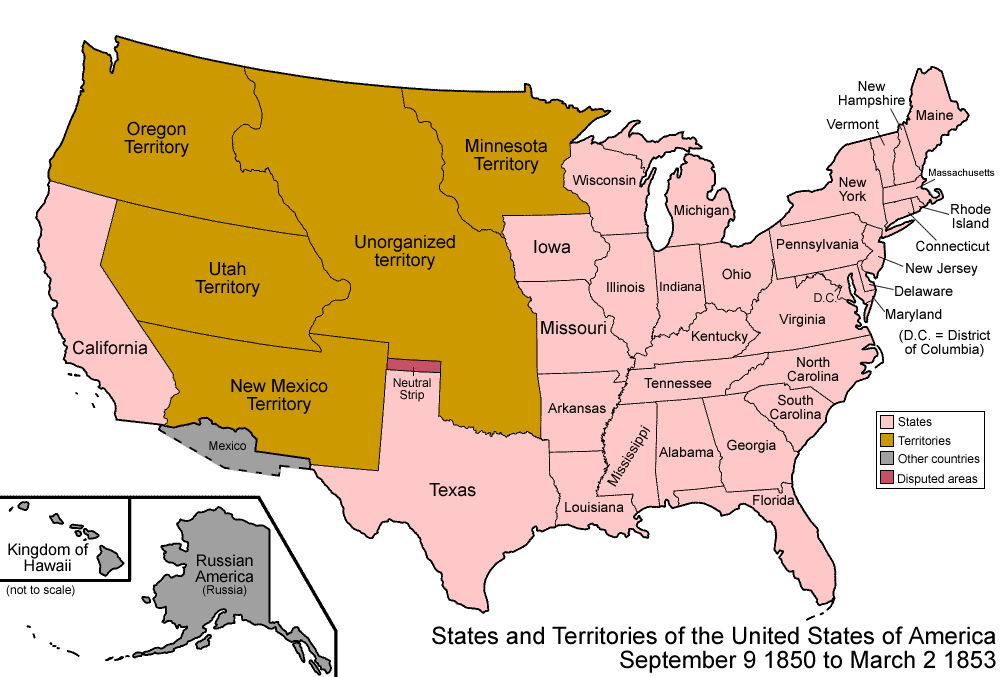
Territorial results of the Compromise: California is admitted free state; Texas relinquishes some territorial claims for debt relief; New Mexico Territory and Utah Territory are organized with slavery undecided

The debate over slavery in the territories continued despite Taylor's death. Though Fillmore favored the broad outlines of Clay's compromise, he did not believe that it could pass via a single bill. With Fillmore's support, Senator James Pearce of Maryland helped defeat Clay's compromise bill by proposing to remove a provision related to the Texas-New Mexico boundary. In the ensuing debate, all provisions of the bill were removed except for the organization of Utah Territory. With the apparent collapse of the bill, Clay took a temporary leave from the Senate, and Democratic Senator Stephen A. Douglas of Illinois took the lead in advocating for a compromise based largely on Clay's proposals. Rather than passing the proposals as one bill, Douglas would seek to pass each proposal one-by-one.

Upon taking office, Fillmore reinforced federal troops in the disputed New Mexico region, and warned Texas Governor Bell to keep the peace. In an August 6, 1850 message to Congress, Fillmore disclosed a belligerent letter from Governor Bell and his own reply to Bell. In that reply, Fillmore denied Texas's claims to New Mexico, asserting that United States had promised to protect the territorial integrity of New Mexico in the Treaty of Guadalupe Hidalgo. In his message to Congress, Fillmore also urged Congress to settle the boundary dispute as quickly as possible, and indicated support for providing monetary compensation to Texas in return for the establishment of New Mexico Territory, which would include all of the land it had controlled prior to the Mexican–American War. Fillmore's forceful response helped convince Texas's U.S. Senators, Sam Houston and Thomas Jefferson Rusk, to support Stephen Douglas's compromise. With their support, a senate bill providing for a final settlement of Texas's borders won passage days after Fillmore delivered his message. Under the terms of the bill, the U.S. would assume Texas's debts, while Texas's northern border was set at the 36° 30' parallel north (the Missouri Compromise line) and much of its western border followed the 103rd meridian. The bill attracted the support of a bipartisan coalition of Whigs and Democrats from both sections, though most opposition to the bill came from the South. The Senate quickly moved onto the other major issues, passing bills that provided for the admission of California, the organization of New Mexico Territory, and the establishment of a new fugitive slave law.

The debate then moved to the House of Representatives, where Fillmore, Webster, Douglas, Congressman Linn Boyd, and Speaker of the House Howell Cobb took the lead in convincing members to support the compromise bills that had been passed in the Senate. The Senate's proposed settlement of the Texas-New Mexico boundary faced intense opposition from many Southerners, as well as from some Northerners who believed that the Texas did not deserve monetary compensation. After a series of close votes that nearly delayed consideration of the issue, the House voted to approve a Texas bill similar to that which had been passed by the Senate. Following that vote, the House and the Senate quickly agreed on each of the major issues, including the banning of the slave trade in Washington. The president quickly signed each bill into law save for the Fugitive Slave Act of 1850; he ultimately signed that law as well after Attorney General Crittenden assured him that the law was constitutional. Though some in Texas still favored sending a military expedition into New Mexico, in November 1850 the state legislature voted to accept the compromise.

Passage of the Compromise of 1850, as it became known, caused celebration in Washington and elsewhere, with crowds shouting, "the Union is saved!" Fillmore himself described the Compromise of 1850 as a "final settlement" of sectional issues, though the future of slavery in New Mexico and Utah remained unclear. The admission of new states, or the organization of territories in the remaining unorganized portion of the Louisiana Purchase, could also potentially reopen the polarizing debate over slavery. Not all accepted the Compromise of 1850; a South Carolina newspaper wrote, "the Rubicon is passed ... and the Southern States are now vassals in this Confederacy." Many Northerners, meanwhile, were displeased by the fugitive slave law.

=== Fugitive Slave Act ===
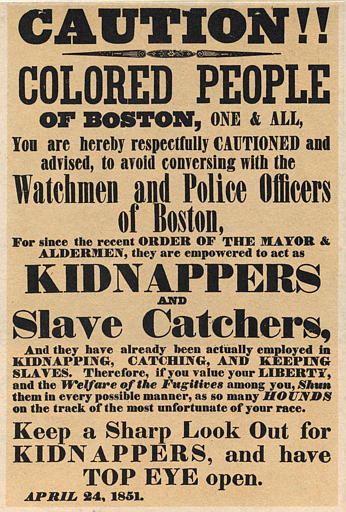
1851 poster warning that the Boston police enforce the Fugitive Slave Act

Fillmore hoped that slavery would one day cease to exist in the United States, but he believed that it was his duty to zealously enforce the Fugitive Slave Act. After 1850, Fillmore's enforcement of the Fugitive Slave Act became the central issue of his administration. The Fugitive Slave Act created the first national system of law enforcement by appointing federal commissioners in every county to hear fugitive slave cases and enforce the fugitive slave law. As there were few federal courts operating throughout the country, the appointment of commissioners allowed for the enforcement of a federal law without relying on state courts, many of which were unsympathetic to slave masters or unwilling to even take on fugitive slave cases. The law also penalized commissioners and federal marshals who allowed slaves to escape from their custody, and levied fines against anyone who aided a fugitive slave or interfered with the return of slaves. Fugitive slave proceedings lacked many due process protections such as the right to a jury trial, and defendants were not allowed to testify at their own hearing. Many in the North felt that the Fugitive Slave Act effectively brought slavery into their home states, and while the abolitionist movement remained weak, many Northerners increasingly came to detest slavery.

Though the law was highly offensive to many Northerners, Southerners complained bitterly about perceived slackness in enforcement. Many of the administration's prosecutions or attempts to return slaves ended badly for the government, as in the case of Shadrach Minkins. A major controversy erupted over the fate of Ellen and William Craft, two escaped slaves living in Boston. Fillmore threatened to send federal soldiers into the city in order to compel the return of the Crafts to the South, but the Crafts' escape to England put an end to the controversy. Disputes over fugitive slaves were widely publicized in both the North and the South, inflaming passions and undermining the good feeling that had followed the Compromise. Harriet Beecher Stowe wrote the novel Uncle Tom's Cabin in response to the Fugitive Slave Act, and its publication in 1852 further raised sectional tensions.

=== Stirrings of disunion ===
The Compromise of 1850 shook up partisan alignments in the South, with elections being contested by Unionists and extremist "Fire-Eaters" rather than Whigs and Democrats. The Georgia Platform represented the moderate Southern position; it opposed secession, but also demanded Northern compromise on the slavery issue. Fire-Eater leaders like Robert Rhett and William Lowndes Yancey urged secession from the United States, and attempted to win control of the states of the Deep South in the 1851 elections. Fillmore took the threat of secession seriously, and on the advice of General Winfield Scott he strengthened the garrisons of federal forts in Charleston and other parts of the South. In the 1851 elections, Unionists won victories in Georgia, Alabama, and Mississippi. Even in South Carolina, the state most open to talk of secession, voters rejected the possibility of unilateral secession from the United States. The victory of pro-compromise Southern politicians in several elections, along with Fillmore's attempts at diligently enforcing the Fugitive Slave Clause, temporarily quieted Southern calls for secession. There was less support for outright secession in the North than in the South, but in the aftermath of the Compromise politicians such as Seward began contemplating the creation of a new major party explicitly opposed to the extension of slavery. Despite the disruptions caused by the debate over the Compromise, no major long-term partisan realignment occurred during Fillmore's presidency, and both parties remained intact for the 1852 presidential election.

=== Other issues ===
(1851). "Reception of President Fillmore". Gleason's Pictorial

A longtime supporter of national infrastructure development, Fillmore called for investments in roads, railroads, and waterways. He signed bills to subsidize the Illinois Central railroad from Chicago to Mobile, and for a canal at Sault Ste. Marie. The 1851 completion of the Erie Railroad in New York prompted Fillmore and his cabinet to ride the first train from New York City to the shores of Lake Erie, in company with many other politicians and dignitaries. Fillmore made many speeches along the way from the train's rear platform, urging acceptance of the Compromise, and afterwards went on a tour of New England with his Southern cabinet members. Although Fillmore urged Congress to authorize a transcontinental railroad, it did not do so until a decade later. Fillmore was a longtime proponent of Clay's American System, which favored a high tariff and federally-supported banks and infrastructure projects, but Congress did not consider major revisions to banking laws or the tariff during Fillmore's presidency. In a period of budget surpluses and economic prosperity, few congressmen saw the need for a higher tariff or economic interventionism.

To deescalate the Mormon issue, Fillmore appointed Church of Jesus Christ of Latter-day Saints leader Brigham Young as the first governor of Utah Territory in September 1850. In gratitude, Young named the first territorial capital "Fillmore" and the surrounding county "Millard".

In August 1850, the social reformer Dorothea Dix wrote to Fillmore, urging support for her proposal in Congress for land grants to finance asylums for the impoverished mentally ill. Though her proposal did not pass, they became friends and continued to correspond well after Fillmore's presidency.

On September 21, 1850, Fillmore signed the Donation Land Claim Act of 1850 which was intended to promote homestead settlements in the Oregon Territory, but ended up displeasing Native Americans.

Noting that many miners involved in the California Gold Rush were forced to sell their gold at a discount, Fillmore asked Congress to create a federal mint in California, resulting in the establishment of the San Francisco Mint.

== Foreign affairs ==
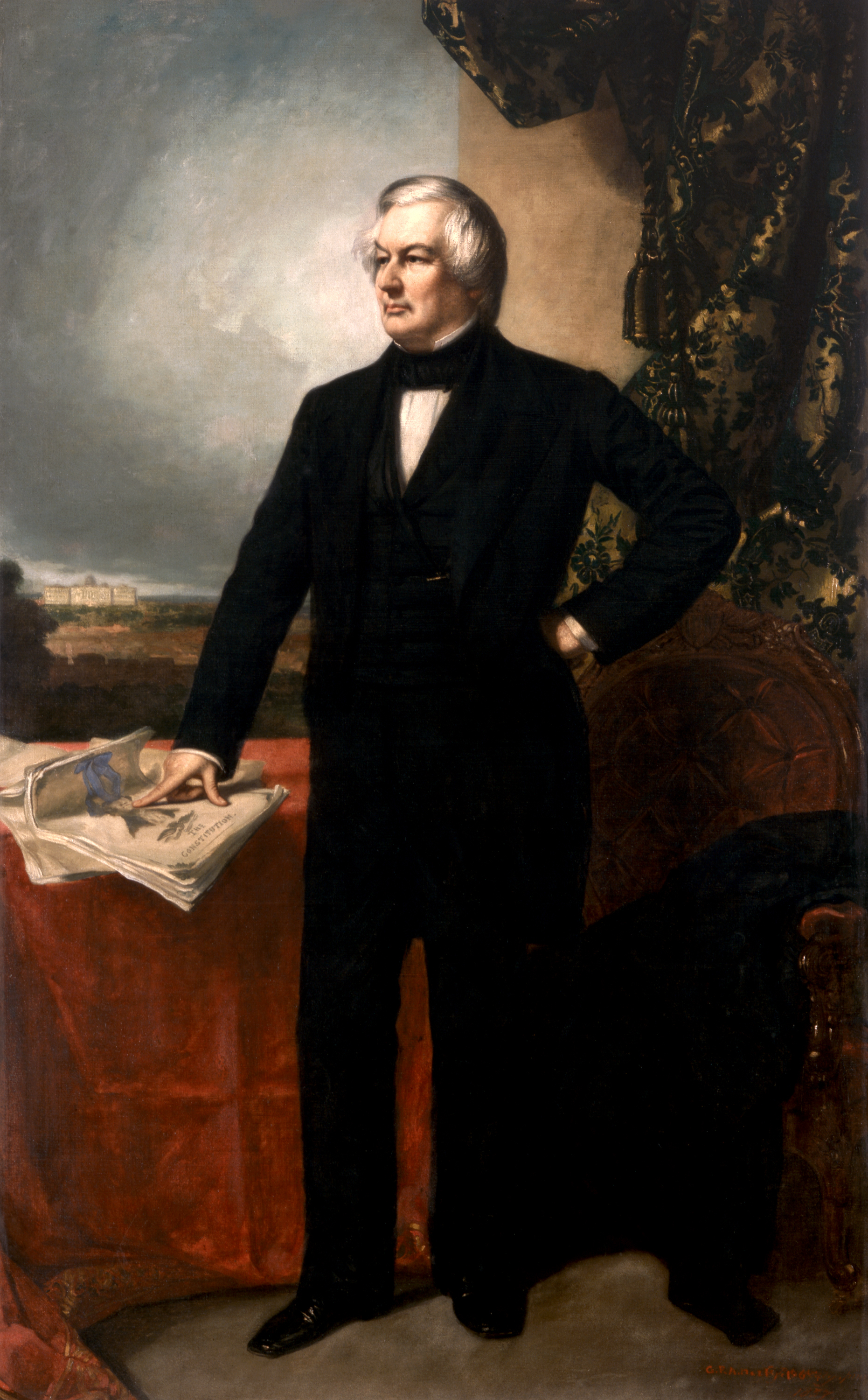
Official White House portrait of Millard Fillmore

Fillmore oversaw two highly competent Secretaries of State: Daniel Webster, and, after the New Englander's 1852 death, Edward Everett. Fillmore was highly active, looking over their shoulders and making all major decisions. The president was particularly active in Asia and the Pacific, especially with regard to Japan, which at this time still prohibited nearly all foreign contact. American businessmen wanted Japan "opened up" for trade, and businessmen and the navy alike wanted the ability to visit Japan to stock up on provisions such as coal. Many Americans were also concerned by the fate of shipwrecked American sailors, who were treated as criminals in Japan. Fillmore began planning an expedition to Japan in 1850, but the expedition, led by Commodore Matthew C. Perry, did not leave until November 1852. Though the Perry Expedition did not reach Japan until after Fillmore's presidency, it served as the catalyst for the end of Japan's isolationist policy. Fillmore also supported an effort to build a railroad across Mexico's Isthmus of Tehuantepec, but disagreements among the United States, Mexico, and rival companies prevented the railroad's construction.

Letter from Millard Fillmore to the Emperor of Japan

As part of a broader strategy of establishing U.S. influence in the Pacific, Fillmore and Webster also sought increased influence in Hawaii, which U.S. policymakers saw as an important link between the U.S. and Asia. In 1842, President John Tyler had announced the "Tyler doctrine," which proclaimed that the U.S. would not accept annexation of Hawaii by a European power. France under Napoleon III sought to annex Hawaii, but backed down after Fillmore issued a strongly worded message warning that "the United States would not stand for any such action." The U.S. also signed a secret treaty with King Kamehameha III of Hawaii which stipulated that the U.S. would gain sovereignty over Hawaii in case of war. Although many in Hawaii and the U.S. desired the annexation of Hawaii as U.S. state, the U.S. was unwilling to grant full citizenship to Hawaii's non-white population.

Many Southerners hoped to see Cuba, a Spanish slave-holding colony, annexed to the United States. Venezuelan adventurer Narciso López recruited Americans for three filibustering expeditions to Cuba, in the hope of overthrowing Spanish rule there. After the second attempt in 1850, López and some of his followers were indicted for breach of the Neutrality Act, but were quickly acquitted by friendly Southern juries. Fillmore ordered federal authorities to attempt to prevent López from launching a third expedition, and proclaimed that his administration would not protect anyone captured by Spain. López's third expedition ended in total failure, as the Cuban populace once again refused to rally to their would-be liberator. López and several Americans, including the nephew of Attorney General Crittenden, were executed by the Spanish, while another 160 Americans were forced to work in Spanish mines. Fillmore, Webster and the Spanish government worked out a series of face-saving measures, including the release of the American prisoners, that settled a brewing crisis between the two countries. Following the crisis, Britain and France offered a three-party treaty in which all signatories would agree to uphold Spanish control of Cuba, but Fillmore rejected the offer. Many Southerners, including Whigs, had supported the filibusters, and Fillmore's consistent opposition to the filibusters further divided his party as the 1852 election approached.

A much-publicized event of Fillmore's presidency was the arrival in late 1851 of Lajos Kossuth, the exiled leader of a failed Hungarian revolution against Austria. Kossuth wanted the U.S. to recognize Hungary's independence. Many Americans were sympathetic to the Hungarian rebels, especially recent German immigrants, who were now coming to the U.S. in large numbers and had become a major political force. Kossuth was feted by Congress, and Fillmore allowed a White House meeting after receiving word that Kossuth would not try to politicize it. In spite of his promise, Kossuth made a speech promoting his cause. The American enthusiasm for Kossuth petered out, and he departed for Europe; Fillmore refused to change American policy, remaining neutral.

== 1852 election and completion of term ==
As the election of 1852 approached, Fillmore remained undecided whether to run for a full term as president. Fillmore's enforcement of the Fugitive Slave Act had made him unpopular among many in the North, but he retained considerable support from the South, where he was seen as the only candidate capable of uniting the party. Secretary Webster had long coveted the presidency and, though in poor health, planned a final attempt to gain the White House. Webster hoped that his pro-Compromise stance would help him garner support throughout the country, but his reputation as the spokesman for New England limited his appeal outside of his home region, especially in the South. Fillmore was sympathetic to the ambitions of his longtime friend, but was reluctant to rule out accepting the party's 1852 nomination, as he feared doing so would allow Seward to gain control of the party. Yet he also believed that the Whig nominee was likely to lose in 1852, and feared that a loss would bring an end to his political career. Ultimately, he refused to pull out of the race, and allowed his supporters to run his campaign for the Whig nomination. A third candidate emerged in the form of General Winfield Scott, who, like previously successful Whig presidential nominees William Henry Harrison and Zachary Taylor, had earned fame for his martial accomplishments. Though Thurlow Weed advised Seward to accept whoever the Whigs nominated, Seward threw his backing behind Scott. Scott had supported the Compromise of 1850, but his association with Seward made him unacceptable to Southern Whigs. Thus, approaching the June 1852 Whig National Convention in Baltimore, the major candidates were Fillmore, Webster, and General Scott. Supporters of the Compromise of 1850 were split between Fillmore and Webster, while Northern opponents of the Compromise backed Scott.

Stephen Douglas's role in the Compromise of 1850, along with his aggressive rhetoric in foreign policy, had made him a front-runner for the 1852 Democratic nomination. But by the time of the May 1852 Democratic National Convention, former Secretary of State James Buchanan of Pennsylvania had eclipsed Douglas, who had made several enemies in the party and faced rumors about his drinking. The convention deadlocked between 1848 nominee Lewis Cass of Michigan and Buchanan, each of whom led on different ballots. On the 49th ballot, the party nominated former New Hampshire senator Franklin Pierce, who had been out of national politics for nearly a decade before 1852. The nomination of Pierce, a Northerner sympathetic to the Southern view on slavery, united the Democrats and gave the party a decided advantage in the 1852 campaign.

Democrat Franklin Pierce defeated Whig Winfield Scott in the 1852 election

The 1852 Whig National Convention convened on June 16. Two days later, at the urging of Southern delegates, the Whig National Convention passed a party platform endorsing the Compromise as a final settlement of the slavery question. On the convention's first presidential ballot, Fillmore received 133 of the necessary 147 votes, while Scott won 131 and Webster won 29. After the 46th ballot still failed to produce a presidential nominee, the delegates voted to adjourn until the following Monday. Fillmore supporters offered a deal to the delegates backing Webster: if Webster could win 40 votes on one of the next two ballots, then the Fillmore delegates would switch to Webster. If not, then the Webster delegates would back Fillmore. When informed of the proposed arrangement, Fillmore quickly agreed, but Webster refused to consent to the deal until Monday morning. Scott's supporters were also active over the weekend, and they won the commitment of some delegates who preferred Scott as their second choice. On the 48th ballot, Webster delegates began to defect to Scott, and the general gained the nomination on the 53rd ballot. Webster was far more unhappy at the outcome than was Fillmore, and Fillmore rejected Webster's offer to resign as Secretary of State. Many Southern Whigs, including Alexander H. Stephens and Robert Toombs, refused to support Scott.

Scott proved to be a poor candidate who lacked popular appeal, and he suffered the worst defeat in Whig history. Whigs also lost several congressional and state elections. Scott won just four states and 44 percent of the popular vote, while Pierce won just under 51 percent of the popular vote and a large majority of the electoral vote. The party platform's endorsement of the Compromise of 1850 had destroyed Scott's hope of winning the support of the leaders of the Free Soil Party, and the party nominated John P. Hale for president. Hale's candidacy damaged the Whig ticket in the North, while distrust and apathy led many Southern Whigs to vote for Pierce or to sit out the election. The final months of Fillmore's term were uneventful, and Fillmore left office on March 4, 1853.

== Historical reputation ==
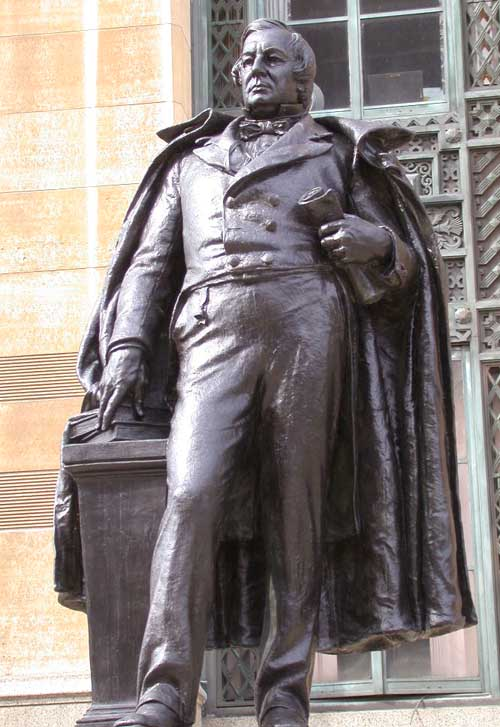
Statue of Fillmore outside City Hall in downtown Buffalo, New York

According to his biographer, Robert Scarry: "No president of the United States ... has suffered as much ridicule as Millard Fillmore". He ascribed much of the abuse to a tendency to denigrate the presidents who served in the years just prior to the Civil War as lacking in leadership. For example, president Harry S. Truman "characterized Fillmore as a weak, trivial thumb-twaddler who would do nothing to offend anyone", responsible in part for the Civil War. Professional historians are no more kind. Paul Finkelman commented, "on the central issues of the age his vision was myopic and his legacy is worse ... in the end, Fillmore was always on the wrong side of the great moral and political issues". Finkelman argues that the central accomplishment of Fillmore's tenure, the Compromise of 1850, should instead be called the "Appeasement of 1850" due to its abandoning of the Wilmot Proviso, thereby opening up all of the territories of the Mexican Cession to slavery.

On a more favorable note, historian Elbert B. Smith found him to be "a conscientious president" who chose to honor his oath of office and enforce the Fugitive Slave Act, rather than govern based on his personal preferences. According to Smith, the enforcement of the Fugitive Slave Act has given Fillmore an undeserved pro-southern reputation, and the evaluation of his presidency has also suffered because "even those who give him high marks for his support of the compromise have done so almost grudgingly, probably because of his Know-Nothing candidacy in 1856". Paul G. Calabresi and Christopher S. Yoo, in their study of presidential power, deemed Fillmore "a faithful executor of the laws of the United States—for good and for ill". Rayback applauded "the warmth and wisdom with which he had defended the Union". Benson Lee Grayson suggested that Fillmore's constant attention to Mexico avoided a resumption of the war and laid the groundwork for the Gadsden Treaty during Pierce's presidency. Fred I. Greenstein and Dale Anderson praised Fillmore for his resoluteness in his early months in office, noting that Fillmore "is typically described as stolid, bland, and conventional, but such terms underestimate the forcefulness evinced by his handling of the Texas–New Mexico border crisis, his decision to replace Taylor's entire cabinet, and his effectiveness in advancing the Compromise of 1850".

Polls of historians and political scientists have generally ranked Fillmore in the bottom quartile of presidents. A 2018 poll of the American Political Science Association’s Presidents and Executive Politics section ranked Fillmore as the sixth-worst president. A 2017 C-SPAN poll of historians ranked Fillmore as the seventh-worst president.

In his profile of Fillmore for the Miller Center of Public Affairs, historian Michael Holt writes:

From the modern perspective, Fillmore seems almost an invisible man among Presidents. Books on him are all but nonexistent. But his accomplishments, while not great, were nonetheless substantial. In addition to the fine legislative engineering that passed the compromise, Fillmore also conducted a disciplined, principled foreign policy.

== Works cited ==
- Abraham, Henry Julian (2008). Justices, Presidents, and Senators: A History of the U.S. Supreme Court Appointments from Washington to Bush II. Rowman & Littlefield. ISBN 978-0-7425-5895-3.
- Bordewich, Fergus M. (2012). America's Great Debate: Henry Clay, Stephen A. Douglas, and the Compromise That Preserved the Union. Simon & Schuster. ISBN 9781439124604.
- Calabresi, Steven G.; Yoo, Christopher S. (2008). The Unitary Executive: Presidential Power from Washington to Bush. Yale University Press. ISBN 978-0-300-12126-1.
- Finkelman, Paul (2011). Millard Fillmore. The American Presidents. Times Books. ISBN 978-0-8050-8715-4.
- Gienapp, William E. (1984). "The Whig Party, the Compromise of 1850, and the Nomination of Winfield Scott". Presidential Studies Quarterly. 14 (3): 399–415. JSTOR 27550101.
- Grayson, Benson Lee (1981). The Unknown President: The Administration of Millard Fillmore. University Press of America. ISBN 978-0-8191-1457-0.
- Greenstein, Fred I.; Anderson, Dale (2013). Presidents and the Dissolution of the Union: Leadership Style from Polk to Lincoln. Princeton University Press. ISBN 978-1-4008-4641-2.
- Herring, George (2008). From Colony to Superpower: U.S. Foreign Relations Since 1776. New York: Oxford University Press. ISBN 978-0-19-507822-0.
- Holt, Michael (1999). The Rise and Fall of the American Whig Party: Jacksonian Politics and the Onset of the Civil War. Oxford University Press.
- McPherson, James (2003). The Illustrated Battle Cry of Freedom: The Civil War Era. Oxford University Press. ISBN 978-0-19-974390-2.
- Rayback, Robert J. (2015) [1959]. Millard Fillmore: Biography of a President (Kindle ed.). Pickle Partners Publishing.
- Scarry, Robert J. (2001). Millard Fillmore (Kindle ed.). McFarland & Co., Inc. ISBN 978-1-4766-1398-7.
- Smith, Elbert B. (1988). The Presidencies of Zachary Taylor & Millard Fillmore. The American Presidency. University Press of Kansas. ISBN 978-0-7006-0362-6.
- Snyder, Charles M. (1975). The Lady and the President: The Letters of Dorothea Dix and Millard Fillmore. University Press of Kentucky. ISBN 978-0-8131-1332-6.
