= Newcomen Memorial Engine =

Preserved beam engine in Devon, England

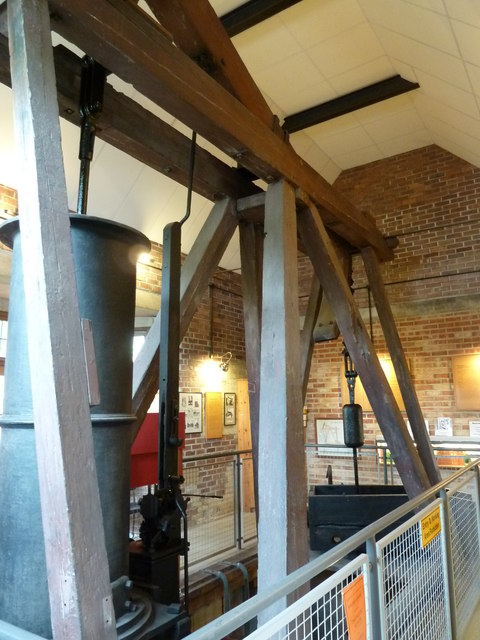

Origins
- Type: Newcomen atmospheric engine
- Designer: Thomas Newcomen
- Date: 1725
- Country of origin: England
- Former operator: Various
- Purpose: Pumping water: Mine drainage, later canal supply

Measurements
- Cylinders: 1
- Bore: 22 inches (56 cm)
- Stroke: 5 feet (1.5 m)

Preservation
- Location: Dartmouth Visitor Centre, Devon
- Coordinates: 50°21′08″N 3°34′42″W
- Working: No

The Newcomen Memorial Engine (sometimes called the Coventry Canal Engine) is a preserved beam engine in Dartmouth, Devon. It was preserved as a memorial to Thomas Newcomen (d. 1729), inventor of the beam engine, who was born in Dartmouth.

The engine is the world's oldest surviving steam engine.

== The engine ==
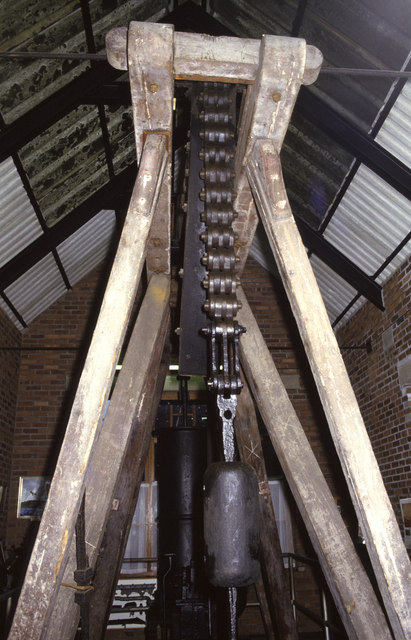
The arch head and piston chain of the engine

=== Newcomen engines ===
Newcomen's first successful engine is considered to be the Dudley Castle engine of 1712. Newcomen engines were used for applications that required the raising of water, such as the draining of coal mines. These 'fire engines' became popular for mining and 104 were in use by 1733, (Note: 1733 was when the extended Thomas Savery patent expired. Up until then these engines had paid a licensing fee to Savery's successors and so left detailed records.) eventually over two thousand of them were installed.

=== Re-use of old engines ===
Although a radical new invention at its time, the Newcomen design was later (ca. 1775) supplanted by improved engines to the designs of Smeaton or Watt. The original Newcomen engine was inefficient in its use of fuel. This led to an extensive trade in both upgrading older engines with newly invented features, and in trading older engines to less demanding sites as they were replaced. Older engines would often continue in colliery areas where coal was cheap.

Engines of this period had a considerable cost in the manufacture of their cylinder, a difficult engineering problem for the day. Their timber beams, pumps and engine house were relatively cheap in comparison. When second-hand engines were traded to other sites, it is this cylinder that is most easily traced, with many working on several sites over their lifetime. The surviving engines of this period have mostly been moved from their original leading-edge sites to some quiet backwater, often pumping water into canals, where they languished with only intermittent use. This was often seasonal, pumping only being required during a dry summer, and so the heavy coal consumption of an early engine was acceptable. (Note: The beam engines at Crofton Pumping Station on the Kennet and Avon Canal continue in such service to this day.)

=== Griff Colliery ===
The early history of this engine is unclear but it was built some time around the start of the 18th century.

Newcomen constructed an engine for Griff Colliery near Nuneaton in 1714 "to draw water by the impellant force of fire". The first engine was to be capable of pumping 16,700 litres of water per hour from the mine, with a maximum depth of 140 feet (43 m). This first engine was working by 1715. It had "a copper boiler, a brass steam barrel (cylinder) and piston, two pit barrels of pott metal (cast iron) and other pypes cisterns and appurtenances thereto belonging". The brass cylinder may have been 16 inches (410 mm) in diameter and 9 feet (2.7 m) long. (Note: Although brass now seems an extravagant material for a large cylinder, it had an established history from its use for cannon. The problems of boring an accurate bore in both are similar and the first steam engine cylinders were bored by adaptions of cannon-boring machines.)

For this engine a patent premium of £7 "payable on Saturday of each week" was due. Seeing how well the engine performed, the mine owners hoped to take over the maintenance of the engine, and its costs, with an option to build other engines under the terms of the patent. This was agreed, and the partners paid £150 for the first six months with further payments of £420 per year for each mine drained.

A second engine was erected around 1719. The mine though was not as profitable as expected and the original partners surrendered their 29-year lease in 1720, after only 7 years.

New owners had a third engine, the surviving Memorial Engine, erected in 1725. It is likely that this was a rebuilt version of the first engine, with the original brass cylinder replaced with a larger 22 inches (560 mm) bore one of cast iron with a stroke of 5 feet (1.5 m). The engine was capable of pumping at 12 strokes per minute, moving 68,200 litres of water every hour. The engine was not large, even for its time, and used a simple 12 feet (3.7 m) one-piece wooden beam, without additional struts or being made of multiple laminated timbers. It was also carried on a timber frame, rather than being house-built. Further investment followed in 1728 with a new boiler for one of the engines.

The colliery was worked out though and produced little coal after 1728. The Savery patents were still in effect and operating two engines attracted premiums of £300 per annum. The colliery closed over the next few years and the equipment was sold. In 1729 a spare brass cylinder was sold to Measham Colliery, probably that replaced when the Memorial Engine cylinder had been replaced with cast iron. (Note: This sale has given rise to the view that the engine itself was sold in 1729.) The engines, one of which would become the Memorial Engine, were sold in 1731 to Henry Green of the Bedworth Coal Works, south of Griff, and one in 1734 to John Wise, bringing a close to mining at Griff.

=== Oakthorpe Colliery ===
Details of the engine's longest period of service, nearly a century, are uncertain. It seems to have been the later engine sold from Griff in 1734 to John Wise, who was the owner of Oakthorpe Colliery at Measham. Joseph Wilkes would later own the colliery, and its engines.

==== Rebuilding ====
A second rebuilding, or more, took place during this service. Following James Watt's production of the much-improved separate condenser for Newcomen engines there were a number of improvements that were often applied to existing engines.

The most important of these was the 'pickle pot' condenser, a device with the advantages of the separate condenser yet avoiding, barely, the Watt patent. As Watt's patent for the separate condenser ran from 1769 to 1800, these patent-avoiding devices can often be dated to this period: after their invention by Watt, but before the Watt device could simply be copied directly. The Engine also shows evidence of a patched hole in the side of the cylinder, where the original Newcomen injection valve was removed. The pickle-pot condenser is an extension below the cylinder connected by a large diameter pipe. A jet condenser within this works in the same way as the separate Watt condenser. The Watt condenser is attached by a longer, narrow pipe to the cylinder. By claiming that the pickle pot was an 'extension' of the main cylinder, rather than a separate component, it avoided infringing the Watt patent. A requirement for this was also that the haystack boiler was moved away from its traditional Newcomen position, directly beneath the cylinder. This was an innovation described by John Curr in his The Coal Viewer & Engine Builder's Companion of 1797.

Other developments applied to the Engine included plate chain to connect to the arch heads of the beam, rather than the earlier link chains. The Engine's valves were replaced with drop valves, operated by a rack and pinion driven from the arbor, worked by horns and tappets on the moving vertical plug rod.

After pumping at the colliery until around 1821 the engine was in the ownership of a Jonathan Woodhouse. Probably due to replacement by a newer engine, as the colliery continued working, it was sold again. This time out of the coal industry, and to a canal

=== Coventry Canal ===
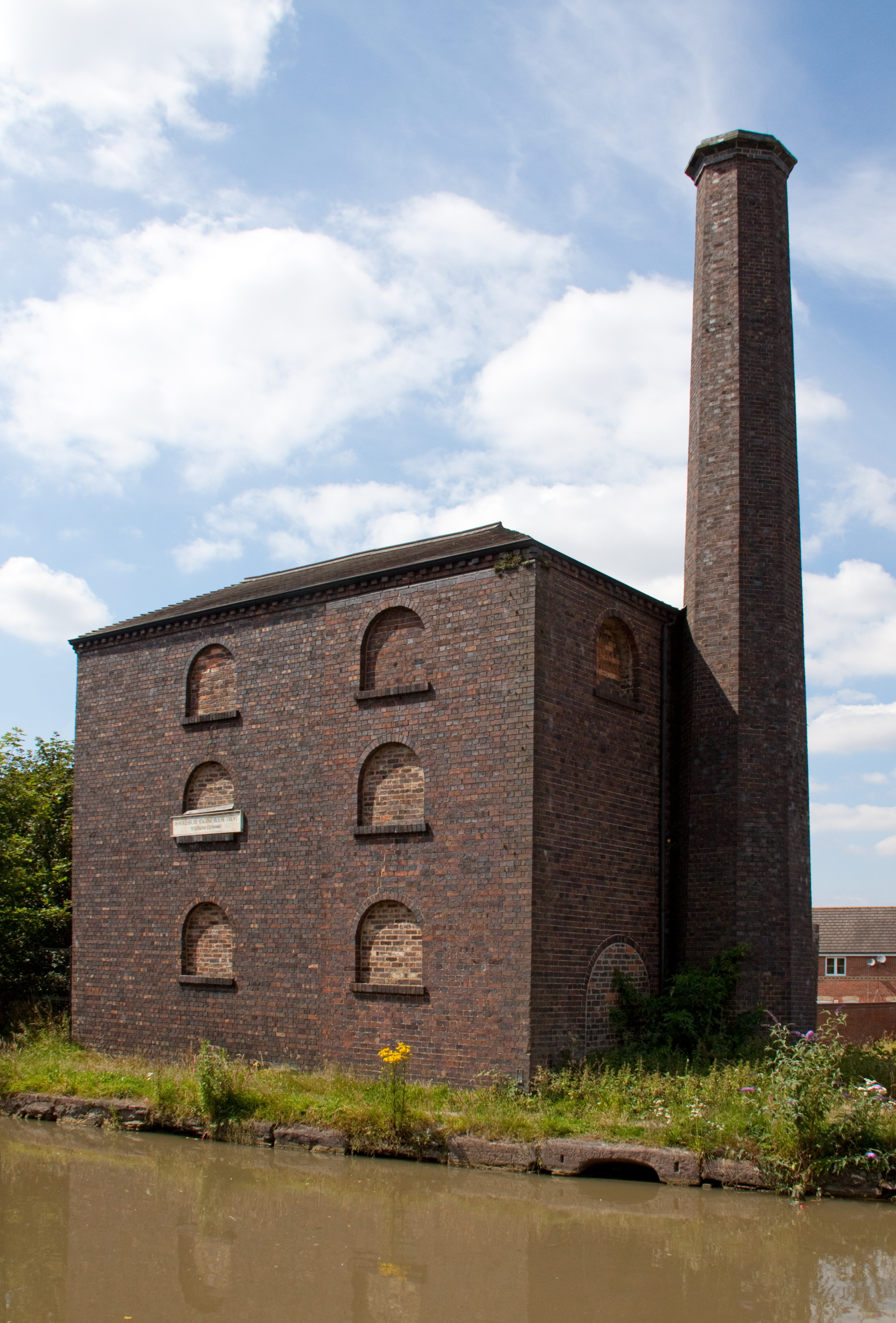
The Engine House at Hawkesbury Junction

The Coventry Canal Company purchased the engine in 1821 and set it to work pumping water from a well to maintain levels in the canal. An engine house, still surviving, was built at the Hawkesbury Junction, Warwickshire in 1837. The engine has sometimes been known as the "Coventry Canal Engine", after this service. The engine stayed in intermittent service here until 1913, a second service of over ninety years.

== Preservation ==
The engine was preserved in 1963 by the Newcomen Society, to commemorate the 300th anniversary of the birth of Thomas Newcomen. It was moved to his birthplace in Dartmouth and re-erected in a new museum there, known as the Newcomen Engine House. This building, originally an electricity substation, also contains the Tourist Information Centre.

The engine is now worked by modern hydraulics and may be seen moving in action.
