= Alexander McNutt =

Alexander McNutt may refer to:

- Alexander McNutt (colonist) (1725–1811), Ulsterman; Nova Scotia colonizer, land agent and British army officer
- Alexander McNutt (governor) (1802–1848), American; Governor of Mississippi
- Alexander McNutt v. Richard J Bland from List of United States Supreme Court cases, volume 43
