= Schuyler Copper Mine =

- Location within Bergen County, New Jersey
- Location: North Arlington, Bergen County, New Jersey, United States; 40°46′43″N 74°7′39″W
- Products: Copper, minor amounts of Gold and Silver
- Opened: 1715
- Active: 1715–1773, 1793–1901 (sporadic)
- Closed: 1901

The Schuyler Copper Mine is an abandoned, historic copper mine located in what is now North Arlington in Bergen County, New Jersey, United States. Operations began in 1715, making it the earliest copper mine in New Jersey and one of the oldest in the United States. In 1755, it was the site of the first use of a steam engine assembled in America. Later, starting in 1794, the first steam engine was manufactured in the United States near here. Shortly before and after, but not during, the American Revolutionary War, the mine was a major copper producer. Even though nothing remains of the mining operations above ground, the collapse of the underground shafts and tunnels caused damage as recently as 1989.

The mine was also known as the Arlington, Belleville, or Victoria copper mine.

== History ==
Around 1710, Arent Schuyler purchased a large tract of land in New Barbadoes Neck. A few years later, around 1712–1713, a significant deposit of copper ore was discovered on the property.

At Arent Schuyler's death, his three sons, Adonijah, John, and Peter, inherited his lands, with John managing the mine.

In 1748, flooding in the mine led John Schuyler to order a Newcomen steam engine and pumping equipment from Jonathan Hornblower of Cornwall, England. The equipment arrived in 1753 and was installed by Jonathan's brother Josiah Hornblower. It started operations in 1755 to pump water out of the mine. This Hornblower engine was then used in one of the oldest and deepest, more than 100 feet (30 m), mine shafts in America. It was later called the Victoria shaft and eventually reached a depth of 347 feet (106 m).

In 1773, after the engine house burned for the third time, mining ceased and it remained idle during the revolutionary war.

After the war was over, mining could resume, but the mines needed to be cleared of water. Instead of buying steam engines from England, the owners set up a foundry and machine shop in nearby Belleville. Here, starting in 1794, the first steam engine was manufactured in the United States.

== Production ==
The earliest production record is a shipment of 110 casks of copper ore sent to Holland in April, 1721. It had to be exported since the colonists were not allowed to refine any native ore. The yield of ore during the 1720s was about 100 short tons (91,000 kg).

Minor amounts of gold and silver were also produced from the copper ore.

== Geology ==
The mine is located in the shales and sandstones of the Passaic Formation where a Triassic diabase sill has intruded. The primary copper minerals found here were the grayish chalcocite and the bright blue-green chrysocolla. In addition, lesser amounts of malachite, azurite, cuprite, and native copper were present.

== Bibliography ==
- Lewis, J. Volney (1907). "The Arlington (Schuyler) Copper Mine". The Geological Survey of New Jersey, Annual Report of the State Geologist for the year 1906 (PDF). Trenton, New Jersey: MacCrellish & Quigley, State Printers. pp. 140–144.
- Muessig, Karl; Dalton, Richard; Volkert, Richard A. (Winter 2008). "New Jersey's Abandoned Mines: A Subsidence Mitigation Plan" (PDF). Unearthing New Jersey Vol. 4, No. 1. New Jersey Geological Survey.
- Müller, F. L. (Winter 2010). "Copper of the Northern New Jersey Piedmont" (PDF). Unearthing New Jersey Vol. 6, No. 1. New Jersey Geological Survey.
- Nelson, William (1883). Josiah Hornblower, and the First Steam Engine in America. Newark, N. J.: Daily Advertiser Printing House.
- Pallis, Ted (Winter 2011). "New Jersey Gold" (PDF). Unearthing New Jersey Vol. 7, No. 1. New Jersey Geological Survey.
- Woodward, Herbert (1944). "Schuyler Mine". Copper Mines and Mining in New Jersey (PDF). Trenton, New Jersey: State of New Jersey Department of Conservation and Development.
