= Hornblower =

Hornblower may refer to:

== People ==
- Hornblower (surname)
- Nathanial Hörnblowér, a pseudonym of American rapper and musician Adam Yauch (1964–2012)

== In fiction ==
- Horatio Hornblower, a British Royal Navy officer, protagonist in C. S. Forester's novel series and a film adaptation
- Hornblower (TV series), a series of television programmes based on Forester's novels
- Hornblower, the pre-Crisis superhero name of Mal Duncan, a DC Comics character

== Other uses ==
- City Cruises, formerly Hornblower Cruises, San Francisco–based charter yacht, dining cruise and ferry service company
  - Hornblower Hybrid, the first known multi-hulled hybrid ferry boat (class) in the United States

== See also ==
- Horn (instrument) blower
- Hornblower & Marshall, a U.S. architectural firm
- Hornblower & Weeks, a former investment banking firm founded in 1888
- Hornblower and Page, a former finance firm, predecessor to Hornblower and Weeks that was founded by Henry Hornblower
- Loeb, Rhoades, Hornblower & Co., a former Wall Street brokerage firm
- The Hornblower Brothers, a British band
- Edward Hornblower House and Barn, Arlington, Massachusetts, United States
