= Thomas Newcomen =

English inventor, preacher and ironmonger (1664–1729)

- Born: 1664; Dartmouth, Devon, England
- Died: 5 August 1729 (aged 65); London, England
- Known for: Inventing the first practical steam engine

Animation of a schematic Newcomen engine. – Steam is shown pink and water is blue. – Valves move from open (green) to closed (red)

Thomas Newcomen (/ˈnjuːkʌmən/; February 1664 (Note: This is often given as 1663 – see Old Style and New Style dates) – 5 August 1729) was an English inventor, creator of the atmospheric engine in 1712, Baptist preacher by calling and ironmonger by trade.

He was born in Dartmouth, in Devon, England, to a merchant family and baptized at St. Saviour's Church on 28 February 1664. In those days, flooding in coal and tin mines was a major problem. Newcomen was soon engaged in trying to improve ways to pump out the water from such mines. His ironmonger's business specialised in designing, manufacturing and selling tools for the mining industry.

== Religious life ==
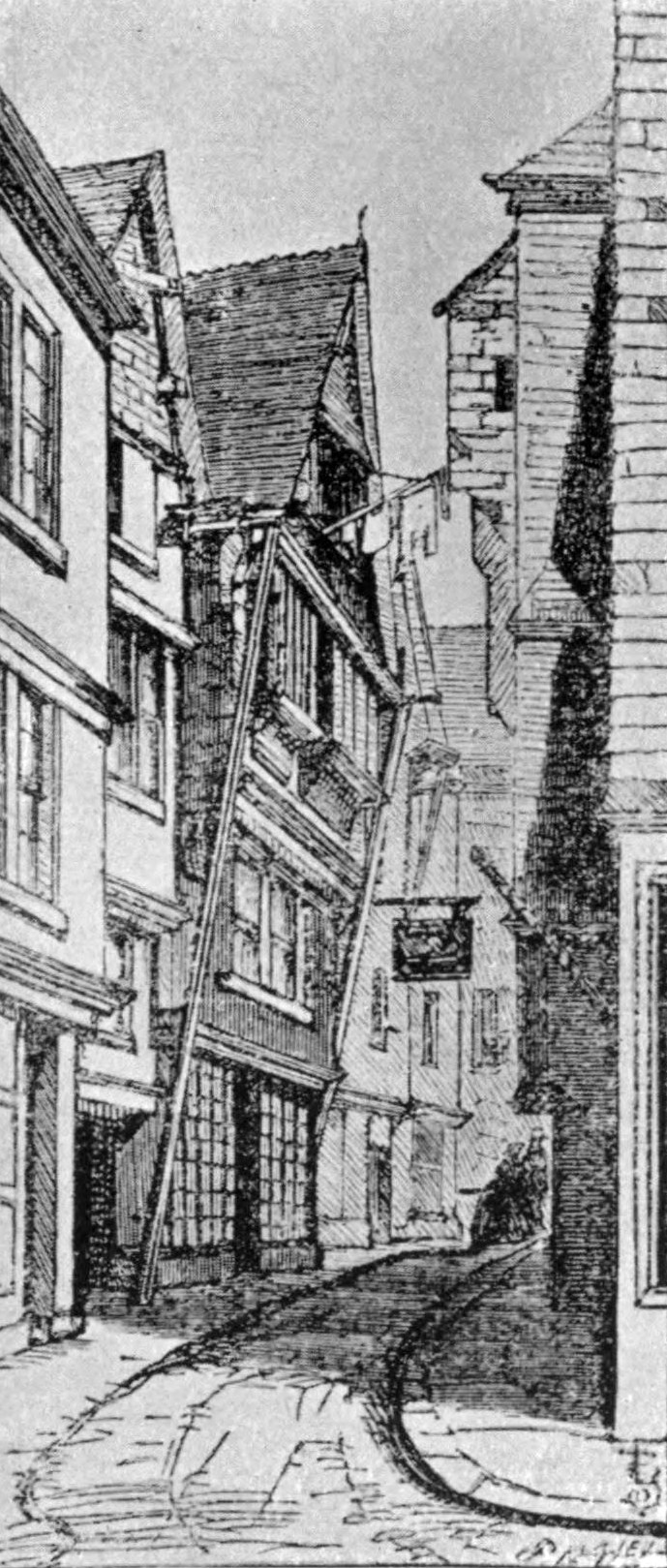
The Newcomen house in Dartmouth

Thomas Newcomen was a lay preacher and a teaching elder in the local Baptist church. After 1710, he became the pastor of a local group of Baptists. His father had been one of a group who brought the well-known Puritan minister John Flavel to Dartmouth. Later one of Newcomen's business contacts in London, Edward Wallin, was another Baptist minister who had connections with the well-known Doctor John Gill of Horsleydown, Southwark. Newcomen's connection with the Baptist church at Bromsgrove materially aided the spread of his steam engine, as the engineers Jonathan Hornblower Sr. and his son were involved in the same church.

== Developing the atmospheric engine ==
Newcomen's great achievement was his steam engine, developed around 1712; combining the ideas of Thomas Savery and Denis Papin, he created a steam engine for the purpose of lifting water out of a tin mine. It is likely that Newcomen was already acquainted with Savery, whose forebears were merchants in south Devon. Savery also had a post with the Commissioners for Sick and Hurt Seamen, which took him to Dartmouth. Savery had devised a "fire engine", a kind of thermic syphon, in which steam was admitted to an empty container and then condensed. The vacuum thus created was used to suck water from the sump at the bottom of the mine. The "fire engine" was not very effective and could not work beyond a limited depth of around thirty feet.

Newcomen replaced the receiving vessel (where the steam was condensed) with a cylinder containing a piston based on Papin's design. Instead of the vacuum drawing in water, it drew down the piston. This was used to work a beam engine, in which a large wooden beam rocked upon a central fulcrum. On the other side of the beam was a chain attached to a pump at the base of the mine. As the steam cylinder was refilled with steam, readying it for the next power stroke, water was drawn into the pump cylinder and expelled into a pipe to the surface by the weight of the machinery. Newcomen and his partner John Calley built the first successful engine of this type at the Conygree Coalworks, Tipton, in the West Midlands. A working replica of this engine can be seen at the Black Country Living Museum nearby.

== Later life and death ==
Comparatively little is known of Newcomen's later life. After 1715, the engine affairs were conducted through an unincorporated company, the 'Proprietors of the Invention for Raising Water by Fire'. Its secretary and treasurer was John Meres, clerk to the Society of Apothecaries in London. That society formed a company which had a monopoly on supplying medicines to the Navy providing a close link with Savery, whose will he witnessed. The Committee of the Proprietors also included Edward Wallin, a Baptist of Swedish descent; and pastor of a church at Maze Pond, Southwark. Newcomen died at Wallin's house in 1729, and was buried at Bunhill Fields burial ground on the outskirts of the City of London; the exact site of his grave is unknown.

By 1733, about 125 Newcomen engines, operating under Savery's patent (extended by statute so that it did not expire until 1733), had been installed by Newcomen and others in most of the important mining districts of Britain and on the Continent of Europe: draining coal mines in the Black Country, Warwickshire and near Newcastle upon Tyne; at tin and copper mines in Cornwall; and in lead mines in Flintshire and Derbyshire, amongst other places.

== After Newcomen ==
The Newcomen engine held its place without material change for about 75 years, spreading gradually to more areas of the UK and mainland Europe. At first brass cylinders were used, but these were expensive and limited in size. New iron casting techniques pioneered by the Coalbrookdale Company in the 1720s allowed bigger cylinders to be used, up to about 6 feet (1.8 m) in diameter by the 1760s. Experience led to better construction and minor refinements in layout. Its mechanical details were much improved by John Smeaton, who built many large engines of this type in the early 1770s; his improvements were rapidly adopted. By 1775, about 600 Newcomen engines had been built, although many of these had worn out before then, and been abandoned or replaced.

The Newcomen Engine was by no means an efficient machine, although it was probably as complicated as engineering and materials techniques of the early 18th century could support. Much heat was lost when condensing the steam, as this cooled the cylinder. This did not matter unduly at a colliery, where unsaleable small coal (slack) was available, but significantly increased the mining costs where coal was not readily available, as in Cornwall. Newcomen's engine was gradually replaced after 1775 in areas where coal was expensive (especially in Cornwall) by an improved design, invented by James Watt, in which the steam was condensed in a separate condenser. The Watt steam engine, aided by better engineering techniques including Wilkinson's boring machine, was much more fuel efficient, enabling Watt and his partner Matthew Boulton to collect substantial royalties based on the fuel saved.

Watt subsequently made other improvements, including the double-acting engine, where both the up and down strokes were power strokes. These were especially suitable for driving textile mills, and many Watt engines were employed in these industries. At first attempts to drive machinery by Newcomen engines had mixed success, as the single power stroke produced a jerky motion, but use of flywheels and better engineering largely overcame these problems. By 1800, hundreds of non-Watt rotary engines had been built, especially in collieries and ironworks where irregular motion was not a problem but also in textile mills.

Despite Watt's improvements, Common Engines (as they were then known) remained in use for a considerable time, and many more Newcomen engines than Watt ones were built even during the period of Watt's patent (up to 1800), as they were cheaper and less complicated. Of over 2,200 engines built in the 18th century, only about 450 were Watt engines. Elements of Watt's design, especially the Separate Condenser, were incorporated in many "pirate" engines. Even after 1800 Newcomen type engines continued to be built and condensers were added routinely to these. × They were also commonly retro-fitted to existing Newcomen engines (the so-called "pickle-pot" condenser).

== Surviving Newcomen engines ==
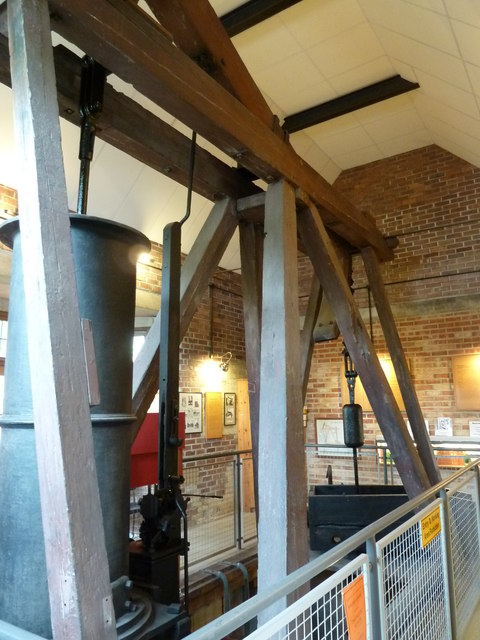
The Newcomen Memorial Engine in Dartmouth, Devon

There are examples of Newcomen engines in the Science Museum, London, England and the Ford Museum, Dearborn, Michigan US, amongst other places.

In 1964, the Newcomen Society of London arranged for a Newcomen engine at Hawkesbury Junction, Warwickshire to be transferred to Dartmouth, where it can be seen working using a hydraulic arrangement instead of the steam boiler. According to Dr. Cyril Boucher of the Newcomen Society, this Newcomen Memorial Engine dates from about 1725, with new valve gear and other parts added later.

Perhaps the last Newcomen-style engine to be used commercially – and the last still remaining on its original site – is at the Elsecar Heritage Centre, near Barnsley in South Yorkshire. It was restored to working condition between 2012 and 2015; the refurbished engine was unveiled by Prince Edward, Earl of Wessex, in May 2016. Another Newcomen engine that can be shown working is the modern replica engine at the Black Country Museum in Dudley, West Midlands. The Newcomen Memorial Engine at Dartmouth, Devon can be seen moving, but is worked by hydraulics.

== Recognition ==
On 23 February 2012 the Royal Mail released a stamp featuring Newcomen's atmospheric steam engine as part of its "Britons of Distinction" series.
