= List of United States Supreme Court cases, volume 43 =

Supreme Court of the United States
- Interactive map of Supreme Court of the United States
- 38°53′26″N 77°00′16″W
- Established: March 4, 1789; 236 years ago
- Location: Washington, D.C.
- Coordinates: 38°53′26″N 77°00′16″W
- Composition method: Presidential nomination with Senate confirmation
- Authorised by: Constitution of the United States, Art. III, § 1
- Judge term length: life tenure, subject to impeachment and removal
- Number of positions: 9 (by statute)
- Website: supremecourt.gov

This is a list of cases reported in volume 43 (2 How.) of United States Reports, decided by the Supreme Court of the United States in 1844.

== Nominative reports ==
In 1874, the U.S. government created the United States Reports, and retroactively numbered older privately-published case reports as part of the new series. As a result, cases appearing in volumes 1–90 of U.S. Reports have dual citation forms; one for the volume number of U.S. Reports, and one for the volume number of the reports named for the relevant reporter of decisions (these are called "nominative reports").

=== Benjamin Chew Howard ===
Starting with the 42nd volume of U.S. Reports, the Reporter of Decisions of the Supreme Court of the United States was Benjamin Chew Howard. Howard was Reporter of Decisions from 1843 to 1860, covering volumes 42 through 65 of United States Reports which correspond to volumes 1 through 24 of his Howard's Reports. As such, the dual form of citation to, for example, Brockett v. Brockett is 43 U.S. (2 How.) 238 (1844).

== Justices of the Supreme Court at the time of 43 U.S. (2 How.) ==
The Supreme Court is established by Article III, Section 1 of the Constitution of the United States, which says: "The judicial Power of the United States, shall be vested in one supreme Court . . .". The size of the Court is not specified; the Constitution leaves it to Congress to set the number of justices. Under the Judiciary Act of 1789 Congress originally fixed the number of justices at six (one chief justice and five associate justices). Since 1789 Congress has varied the size of the Court from six to seven, nine, ten, and back to nine justices (always including one chief justice).

Justice Smith Thompson died in December 1843. The unpopular President John Tyler failed repeatedly to fill the Thompson vacancy, as the Whig-controlled Senate rejected his nominations of John C. Spencer, Reuben Walworth, Edward King, and John M. Read to the Supreme Court. As a result, the Court had only these eight members during the 1844 term:

Portrait	Justice	Office	Home State	Succeeded	Date confirmed by the Senate (Vote)	Tenure on Supreme Court
	Roger B. Taney	Chief Justice	Maryland	John Marshall	March 15, 1836 (29–15)	March 28, 1836 – October 12, 1864 (Died)
	Joseph Story	Associate Justice	Massachusetts	William Cushing	November 18, 1811 (Acclamation)	February 3, 1812 – September 10, 1845 (Died)
	John McLean	Associate Justice	Ohio	Robert Trimble	March 7, 1829 (Acclamation)	January 11, 1830 – April 4, 1861 (Died)
	Henry Baldwin	Associate Justice	Pennsylvania	Bushrod Washington	January 6, 1830 (41–2)	January 18, 1830 – April 21, 1844 (Died)
	James Moore Wayne	Associate Justice	Georgia	William Johnson	January 9, 1835 (Acclamation)	January 14, 1835 – July 5, 1867 (Died)
	John Catron	Associate Justice	Tennessee	newly created seat	March 8, 1837 (28–15)	May 1, 1837 – May 30, 1865 (Died)
	John McKinley	Associate Justice	Alabama	newly created seat	September 25, 1837 (Acclamation)	January 9, 1838 – July 19, 1852 (Died)
	Peter Vivian Daniel	Associate Justice	Virginia	Philip P. Barbour	March 2, 1841 (25–5)	January 10, 1842 – May 31, 1860 (Died)

== Citation style ==
Under the Judiciary Act of 1789 the federal court structure at the time comprised District Courts, which had general trial jurisdiction; Circuit Courts, which had mixed trial and appellate (from the US District Courts) jurisdiction; and the United States Supreme Court, which had appellate jurisdiction over the federal District and Circuit courts—and for certain issues over state courts. The Supreme Court also had limited original jurisdiction (i.e., in which cases could be filed directly with the Supreme Court without first having been heard by a lower federal or state court). There were one or more federal District Courts and/or Circuit Courts in each state, territory, or other geographical region.

Bluebook citation style is used for case names, citations, and jurisdictions.

- "C.C.D." = United States Circuit Court for the District of . . .
  - e.g.,"C.C.D.N.J." = United States Circuit Court for the District of New Jersey
- "D." = United States District Court for the District of . . .
  - e.g.,"D. Mass." = United States District Court for the District of Massachusetts
- "E." = Eastern; "M." = Middle; "N." = Northern; "S." = Southern; "W." = Western
  - e.g.,"C.C.S.D.N.Y." = United States Circuit Court for the Southern District of New York
  - e.g.,"M.D. Ala." = United States District Court for the Middle District of Alabama
- "Ct. Cl." = United States Court of Claims
- The abbreviation of a state's name alone indicates the highest appellate court in that state's judiciary at the time.
  - e.g.,"Pa." = Supreme Court of Pennsylvania
  - e.g.,"Me." = Supreme Judicial Court of Maine

== List of cases in 43 United States (2 How.) ==
Case Name	Page and year	Opinion of the Court	Concurring opinion(s)	Dissenting opinion(s)	Lower Court	Disposition
McNutt ex rel. Leggett v. Bland	9 (1844)	Baldwin	none	Daniel	C.C.S.D. Miss.	reversed
Gwin v. Breedlove	29 (1844)	Catron	none	Daniel	C.C.S.D. Miss.	multiple
Shriver's Lessee v. Lynn	43 (1844)	McLean	none	none	C.C.D. Md.	affirmed
McCollum v. Eager	61 (1844)	McLean	none	none	C.C.E.D. La.	dismissed
Ex parte Barry	65 (1844)	Story	none	none	original	dismissed
Burke v. McKay	66 (1844)	Story	none	none	C.C.S.D. Miss.	reversed
Spalding v. People ex rel. Backus	66 (1844)	Story	none	none	not indicated	dismissal refused
Knapp v. Banks	73 (1844)	Story	none	none	C.C.S.D.N.Y.	dismissed
Stockton v. Bishop	74 (1844)	Story	none	none	C.C.W.D. Pa.	supersedeas granted
Kinney v. Clark	76 (1844)	Catron	none	none	C.C.D. Ky.	affirmed
Vidal v. Girard's Executors	127 (1844)	Story	none	none	C.C.E.D. Pa.	affirmed
Chapman v. Forsyth	202 (1844)	McLean	none	none	C.C.D. Ky.	certification
The Brig Malek Adhel	210 (1844)	Story	none	none	C.C.D. Md.	affirmed
Brockett v. Brockett	238 (1844)	Story	none	none	C.C.D.C.	dismissal refused
Dromgoole v. Farmers' and Merchants' Bank	241 (1844)	Story	none	none	C.C.S.D. Miss.	reversed
Griffin v. Thompson	244 (1844)	Daniel	none	none	C.C.S.D. Miss.	certification
B. Hagan and Company v. Tinnin	258 (1844)	Daniel	none	none	C.C.S.D. Miss.	certification
Matheson's Administrator v. Grant's Administrator	263 (1844)	Story	none	none	C.C.S.D. Ala.	affirmed
Stoddard v. Chambers	284 (1844)	McLean	none	none	C.C.D. Mo.	reversed
Grignon's Lessee v. Astor	319 (1844)	Baldwin	none	none	Sup. Ct. Terr. Wis.	affirmed
Chouteau v. Eckhart	344 (1844)	Catron	none	none	Mo.	affirmed
Catts v. Phalen	376 (1844)	Baldwin	none	none	C.C.D.C.	affirmed
Dade v. Irwin's Executor	383 (1844)	Story	none	none	C.C.D.C.	affirmed
Minor v. Tillotson	392 (1844)	McLean	none	none	C.C.E.D. La.	affirmed
Taylor v. Savage's Executor	395 (1844)	Story	none	none	N.D. Ala.	dismissed
Rhodes v. Bell	397 (1844)	McLean	none	none	C.C.D.C.	affirmed
Randel v. Brown	406 (1844)	McKinley	none	none	C.C.E.D. Pa.	reversed
Lawrence v. McCalmont	426 (1844)	Story	none	none	C.C.S.D.N.Y.	affirmed
Ex parte Sibbald	455 (1844)	Story	none	none	Fla. Super. Ct.	dismissed
Rhett v. Poe	457 (1844)	Daniel	none	none	C.C.D.S.C.	affirmed
Adams v. Roberts	486 (1844)	Wayne	none	none	C.C.D.C.	affirmed
Louisville, Cincinnati and Charleston Railroad Company v. Letson	497 (1844)	Wayne	none	none	C.C.D.S.C.	affirmed
Burwell v. Cawood	560 (1844)	Story	none	none	C.C.D.C.	affirmed
Ladiga v. Roland	581 (1844)	Baldwin	none	none	Ala.	reversed
Pollard's Lessee v. Files	591 (1844)	Catron	none	none	Ala.	reversed
McCracken v. Hayward	608 (1844)	Baldwin	Catron	none	C.C.D. Ill.	certification
Gaines v. Chew	619 (1844)	McLean	Catron	none	C.C.E.D. La.	certification
Hanson v. Eustace's Lessee	653 (1844)	Wayne	none	none	C.C.E.D. Pa.	reversed
Bank of the United States v. United States	711 (1844)	McLean	Wayne	Catron	C.C.E.D. Pa.	reversed

== See also ==
- Certificate of division
