= Double beat valve =

Type of poppet valve

The double-beat valve, drop valve or equilibrium valve is a type of poppet valve arranged to allow it to be opened against a high pressure with a minimum of force. One of its uses is in steam engines to admit steam to the cylinders and to release the exhaust. In stationary steam engines it is usually operated by trip valve gear while in railway locomotives a valve gear such as Caprotti is used.

== Hornblower's valve ==
It was invented around 1800 by Jonathan Hornblower. His valve is in the form of a hollow cylinder provided with two seats of nearly equal diameter, at A and B in the diagram. The cylinder is connected to the actuating rod by a web. The force required to lift the valve depends on the difference between diameters D and d: the smaller this difference can be made, the less the force necessary to open the valve. In Hornblower's valve, the steam flows past seat B only. In later developments of the valve, the central portion is waisted so that the flow can pass at A as well, so increasing the valve opening area for the same amount of lift.

== Cornish valve ==
In the early nineteenth century the double beat valve was known as the Cornish Valve, a synonym that persisted until the early 20th century. The Cornish valve gear, as used on early beam engines, was invented by Murdock, an assistant of James Watt, in 1820.

== Valve gears ==
Double-beat poppet valves became widely used during the nineteenth century. Francis Stevens invented the Stevens valve gear, a double beat poppet valve, in 1839. It was used throughout the nineteenth century and in the early years of the 20th, on side-wheel paddle steamer engines, including the grasshopper engine, in the United States. The Lentz gear, of German origin, was first applied in Germany in 1899 where it became widespread, and was subsequently also manufactured in the United States. The Putnam engine, a high pressure variable cut-off steam engine built by Putnam Machinery Co. in the United States, featured four double beat poppet valves operated from a single camshaft.

== See also ==
- Steam locomotive nomenclature
