= Jabez Carter Hornblower =

English pioneer of steam power (1744–1814)

- Born: 21 May 1744; Broseley, Shropshire, England
- Died: 14 July 1814 (aged 70); Penryn, Cornwall, England
- Resting place: Bunhill Fields
- Known for: compound steam engine
- Spouses: Mary John; Ann Hanbury
- Children: 8
- Father: Jonathan Hornblower
- Relatives: Jonathan Hornblower (brother); Josiah Hornblower (uncle)

Jabez Carter Hornblower (21 May 1744 – 14 July 1814) was an English pioneer of steam power, and the son of Jonathan Hornblower.

== Early life ==
Hornblower was born in Broseley, Shropshire, England. He was the eldest child of steam engineer Jonathan and Ann Carter Hornblower. He gained his engineering skills working for his father building Newcomen steam engines in Cornwall.

== Career ==
Hornblower later worked for Boulton and Watt building the new Watt steam engines designed and patented by James Watt.

By 1790, he had set up a business in London with financial backing from well-to-do currier John Maberly, where he designed a new steam engine based on the patented designs of Isaac Mainwaring. However, in 1796, Hornblower and Maberly were sued by Boulton and Watt, who claimed one of Watt's patents – concerning the condenser – had been infringed. After a long trial, judgement in 1799 was in favour of Boulton and Watt and brought about the collapse of Hornblower and Maberly's business. In 1803, Hornblower was imprisoned in the King's Bench debtors prison but on his release in 1805 he managed to secure some work in mainland Europe building engines until his return to England in 1813.

== Personal life ==
Hornblower had married twice, once in Cornwall to Mary John, with whom he had four children and, on her death, to Ann Hanbury of Bridgnorth, Shropshire with whom he had another four children.

== Death ==
Hornblower died on 11 July 1814 and was buried in the Bunhill Fields burial ground in London.
