= Josiah Hornblower =

American politician

- Born: February 23, 1729; Staffordshire, England
- Died: January 21, 1809 (aged 79); Newark, New Jersey, U.S.
- Burial place: Belleville Dutch Reformed Church
- Occupations: Engineer and statesman
- Spouse: Elizabeth Kingsland (m. 1755)
- Children: 12, including Joseph Coerten Hornblower
- Relatives: Jonathan Hornblower (brother); Jabez Carter Hornblower (nephew); Jonathan Hornblower (nephew)

Josiah Hornblower (February 23, 1729 – January 21, 1809) was an English engineer and statesman in Belleville, New Jersey. He was a delegate for New Jersey in the Continental Congress in 1785 and 1786.

== Early life ==
Josiah was born in Staffordshire, England, the son of steam power pioneer Joseph Hornblower. As a young man, he studied mechanics and mathematics.

== Career ==
=== Early career ===
In 1745, he started working for his elder brother Jonathan as an engineering apprentice. They went to Cornwall, England and built Newcomen steam engines for use in tin mines. Josiah became an expert in both the engines and mining operations.

=== Engineering and military career ===
On September 9, 1753, Hornblower was brought to America by the Schuyler family to support their copper mines on New Barbadoes Neck. Hornblower settled in Belleville and is credited with building the first steam engine in America in 1755. There is some dispute about the validity of the project, since he apparently (and illegally) brought two or three sets of critical engine parts with him from England.

He continued to practice mechanical and civil engineering for much of his life. In 1794, he built the first stamping mill in America. (A stamping mill mechanically crushes raw ore for further processing.)

Over the years, Hornblower became American in his attitude as well as by residence. In the French and Indian War, he was a captain in the Essex County Regiment of the New Jersey militia. However, his company was assigned for defence and he didn’t see action. In 1760, he opened a hardware store as an adjunct to his engineering work, and became a prosperous merchant.

=== Political career ===
For several years, Josiah had acted as a leading citizen. He served as clerk in various town meetings and for his county. As New Jersey established a revolutionary government, Essex County sent him to the state’s Assembly from 1779–1780, and in 1780, the Assembly named him its speaker. From 1781 until 1784, he represented Essex County as a member of the New Jersey Legislative Council, which functioned as an upper house in the legislature.

Then in 1785, the New Jersey assembly sent Hornblower as one of their delegates to the Continental Congress. His term started in November 1785 and ran for a year. While he was diligent in attendance and voting, he wasn’t a leading member of the Congress. After his year, he returned home to attend to his engineering and mercantile pursuits. He was a candidate for Congress in 1788.

== Personal life ==
In 1755, Josiah married Elizabeth Kingsland, the daughter of William Kingsland, a Colonel and Judge of Bergen County and neighbor of Schuyler, and Mary (née Pinhorne) Kingsland, daughter of Judge William Pinhorne – a Justice of the New Jersey Supreme Court. One of their twelve children was Joseph Coerten Hornblower, who later became Chief Justice of the Supreme Court of New Jersey.

== Later life and death ==
Josiah remained active in engineering circles, and for a time served as the head of a mine association. He expanded his operations, opening various mills in along the Second River and the Passaic River over the next two decades.

He remained somewhat active in public life as well, serving as a County Judge from 1790 until 1808, when his failing health forced him to resign. Josiah died in Newark on January 21, 1809, and is buried in the yard of the Dutch Reformed Church at Belleville.
