= William C. Micou =

American attorney from New Orleans

Postmaster of Augusta, Georgia
- In office January 1831 – January 1837
- Preceded by: James Frazer
- Succeeded by: Edmund B. Glasscock

Personal details
- Born: January 11, 1807 Augusta, Georgia, U.S.
- Died: April 16, 1854 (aged 47) New Orleans, Louisiana, U.S.
- Resting place: Live Oak Cemetery, Pass Christian, Mississippi
- Party: Whig
- Spouse: Anna Davenport Thompson (m. 1831)
- Children: 9
- Education: University of Georgia (BA)
- Profession: Attorney

William Chatfield Micou (January 11, 1807 - April 16, 1854) was an American lawyer who was active in Augusta, Georgia, and New Orleans, Louisiana. He was also an unsuccessful nominee to the United States Supreme Court at the end of the Millard Fillmore administration.

== Biography ==
Micou was born in Augusta, Georgia, on January 11, 1807, the son of William Micou and Martha Ann Chatfield. He graduated from the University of Georgia in 1825.

Micou studied law, was admitted to the bar, practiced in Augusta, and also served as Augusta's postmaster. He later moved to New Orleans, Louisiana, and continued to practice law, joining the firm of Judah P. Benjamin in the late 1840s.

On February 14, 1853, President Millard Fillmore, a Whig, nominated Micou to fill the United States Supreme Court vacancy created by the death of Justice John McKinley. Fillmore had attempted to fill the vacancy twice before, but was unsuccessful; the Senate tabled the August 1852 nomination of Edward A. Bradford, and the January 1853 nomination George Edmund Badger was postponed. Fillmore next offered to nominate Judah Benjamin, who had been elected to the Senate for a term beginning on March 4, 1853, but he declined the position and recommended Micou.

Micou's nomination was not acted upon by the Democratic-led Senate as it was late in the session and Franklin Pierce also a Democrat, was scheduled to succeed Fillmore as president on March 4, so not acting on Micou's nomination would give Pierce the opportunity to submit a nomination of his own. Pierce nominated John Archibald Campbell on March 21, and Campbell was confirmed by the Senate on March 25.

Micou was already in poor health at the time of his nomination and died in New Orleans on April 16, 1854, from an unspecified brain disease thought to have resulted from overwork. He was buried at Live Oak Cemetery in Pass Christian, Mississippi.
