= Joseph Hornblower =

Joseph Hornblower (1696? – 1762) was an English engineer, a pioneer of steam power.

== Biography ==
Joseph Hornblower was born in 1696 in Staffordshire, England.

In 1725 he was engaged to install a Newcomen engine at Wheal Rose, near Truro. He settled in Salem, Cornwall in 1748.

Jonathan Hornblower and Josiah Hornblower were his sons by his first wife Rebecca Haywood whom he married in Netherton, Worcestershire in 1716. He died in Bristol, having had 7 sons and a daughter altogether by his two wives.
