= Edward Hornblower House and Barn =

Historic house in Massachusetts, United States

- U.S. National Register of Historic Places
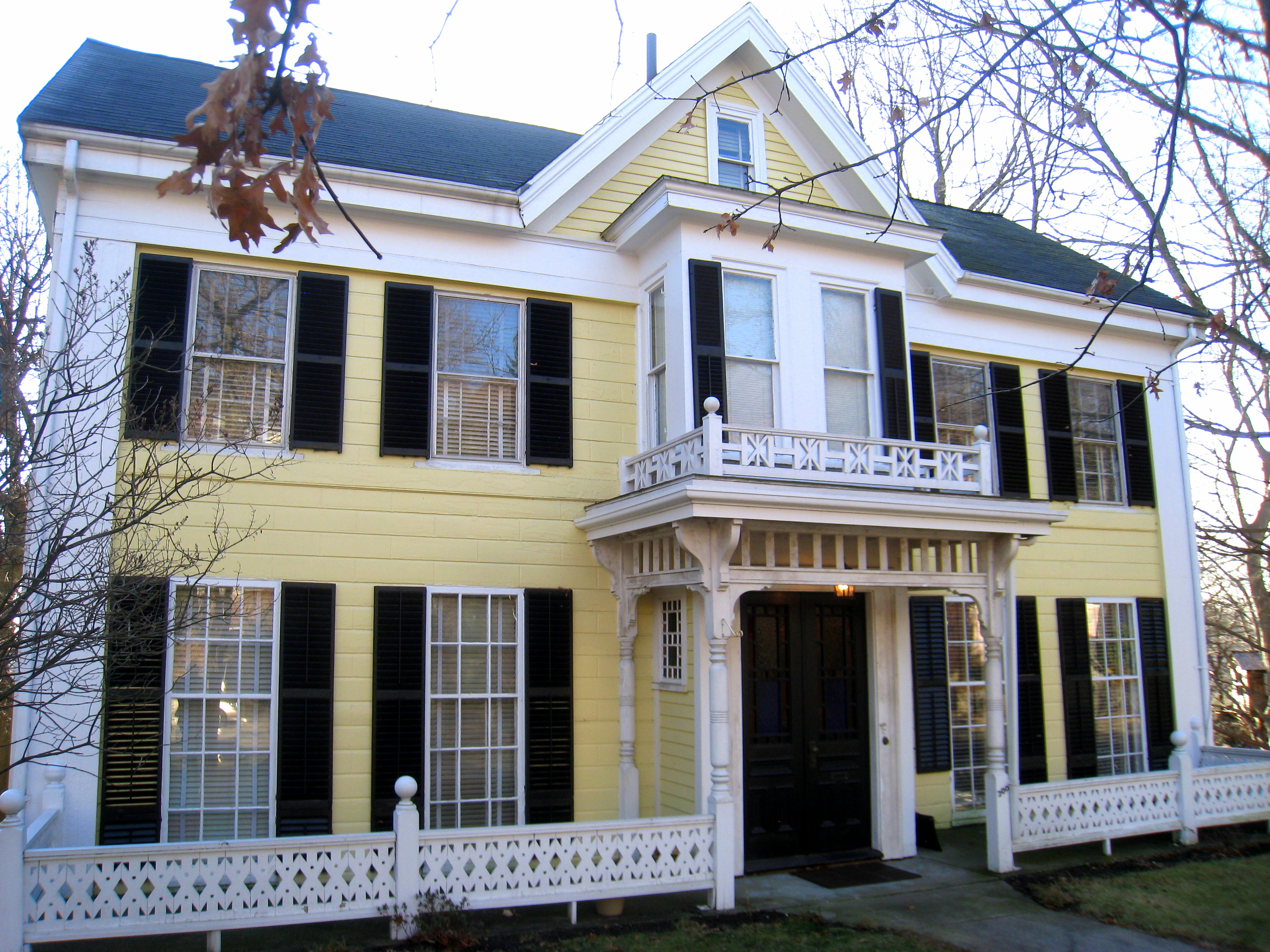

- Location within Massachusetts Location within the United States
- Location: 200 Pleasant Street, Arlington, Massachusetts
- Coordinates: 42°24′30″N 71°9′36″W
- Built: 1805
- Architectural style: Greek Revival
- MPS: Arlington MRA
- NRHP reference No.: 85001035
- Added to NRHP: April 18, 1985

The Edward Hornblower House and Barn is a historic farmstead in Arlington, Massachusetts. The 2.5-story wood-frame house was built c. 1830, and was probably moved to its present location around 1850. At that time it also received stylistic modifications, giving it a more Italianate appearance. It was further modified in the 1870s, probably by financier Edward T. Hornblower, of the Boston brokerage firm Hornblower & Page (later Hornblower & Weeks) to add Renaissance Revival elements. A barn, estimated to date to about 1805, stands behind the house.

The house and barn were listed on the National Register of Historic Places in 1985.

== See also ==
- National Register of Historic Places listings in Arlington, Massachusetts
