= Edward King (jurist) =

American judge

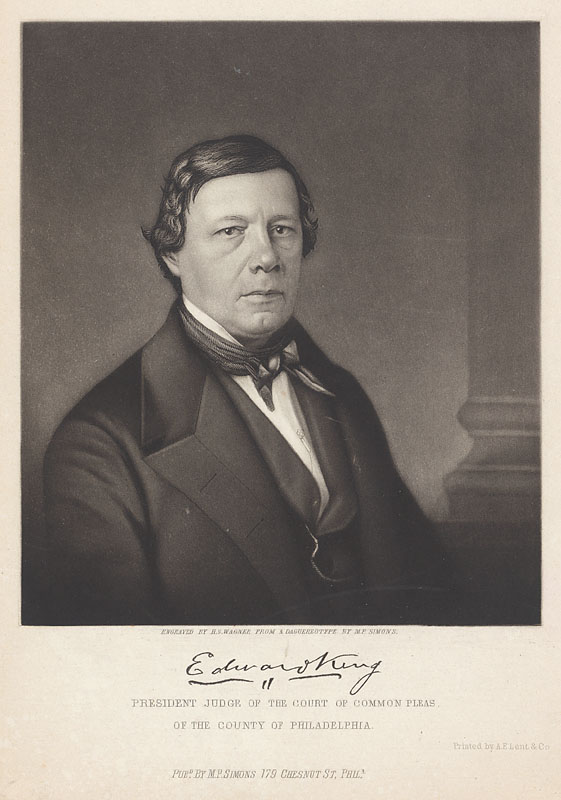

Personal details
- Born: January 31, 1794 Philadelphia, Pennsylvania, U.S.
- Died: May 8, 1873 (aged 79) Philadelphia, Pennsylvania, U.S.
- Party: Federalist (before 1824); Democratic (1828–1873)

Edward King (January 31, 1794 – May 8, 1873) was an American lawyer and president judge of the Philadelphia Court of Common Pleas. He was unsuccessfully nominated to the United States Supreme Court twice.

== Early life ==
King was born on January 31, 1794, in Philadelphia. He was admitted to the Pennsylvania bar in 1816. Soon after, he entered politics, initially as a Federalist and later as a Democrat, eventually rising to leader of the Democratic party in Pennsylvania.

== Judge ==
In 1825, King was named president judge of the Philadelphia Court of Common Pleas. He was instrumental in establishing Pennsylvania's equity courts, thus drawing national attention to himself.

President John Tyler nominated King to the U.S. Supreme Court on June 5, 1844. Because of political pressures between Tyler and Congress, the Senate voted to postpone its consideration, and King withdrew his nomination. Tyler again nominated King on December 4. In January 1845, the Senate tabled the nomination once more. Tyler then withdrew King's nomination on February 7.

King remained as president judge in the common-pleas court until retirement in 1852. That same year, he was elected as a member of the American Philosophical Society.

== Later life and death ==
After King's retirement, he remained active in public and civic affairs. He died in Philadelphia on May 8, 1873.

King retired from the bench in 1852 and was appointed to a commission that revised the criminal code of Pennsylvania.
