= Jonathan Hornblower =

English scientist (1753–1815)

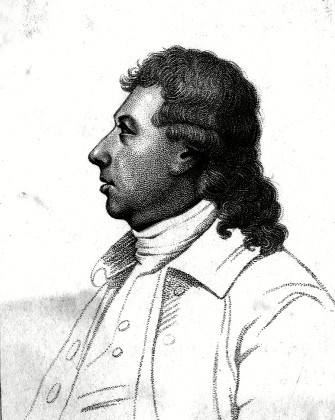
- Jonathan Hornblower
- Born: 5 July 1753; Chacewater, Cornwall, England
- Died: 23 February 1815 (aged 61); Penryn, Cornwall, England
- Resting place: St Gluvias
- Known for: compound steam engine, Double beat valve
- Spouses: Rosamund Phillips (m. 1775): Elizabeth Jordan
- Children: 2
- Father: Jonathan Hornblower
- Relatives: Jabez Carter Hornblower (brother); Josiah Hornblower (uncle)

Jonathan Hornblower (5 July 1753 – 23 February 1815) was an English pioneer of steam power.

== Personal life ==
The son of Jonathan Hornblower the Elder and the brother of Jabez Carter Hornblower, two fellow pioneers, the young Hornblower was educated at Truro Grammar School. He was baptised at Trelever on 25 July 1773, aged 20 (he and his family were much involved in Baptist churches in Cornwall), and was apprenticed to a metal-working tradesman at Penryn. He married twice, first to his cousin Rosamund Phillips in 1775 and later to Elizabeth Jordan with whom he had two surviving daughters, Rosamund (1789) and Elizabeth (1790). He died on 23 February 1815 and is buried in St Gluvias Churchyard.

== Compound engine ==
He invented the compound steam engine in 1781 and patented it on 16 July in the same year. This type of engine has two cylinders, an evolution from the single low pressure, condensing engines of Newcomen and later Watt (who introduced the separate condenser), it introduced a high-pressure cylinder before the low-pressure cylinder. The principle is that the steam first expands in the high-pressure cylinder and afterwards expands again in the low-pressure cylinder. Even though this was a revolutionary new steam technology, he was unfortunately prevented from pursuing his invention by litigation with James Watt (Boulton & Watt) over patents. His compound engine principle was not revived until 1804 (by Arthur Woolf) following the expiration of Boulton and Watt's patent. Hornblower's compound engine principle contributed significantly to the increases in steam engine efficiency, and it was the foundation of the expansion engine.

See Also McNaught'ed Engines

== Rotary engine ==
After the patent litigation with Boulton & Watt, Hornblower came up with an idea for a new kind of rotary engine. He worked on it for several years and patented it on 5 June 1798. The engine's construction was the most complex so far, but as before he ran into trouble with Watt's patents on these subjects.

== Double beat valve ==
He invented the double-beat steam valve around 1800. This valve is a type of poppet valve, it can open against a high pressure with a minimum of force, usually operated by trip valve gear. The valve was used in railway locomotives, beam engines, grasshopper engines and paddle steamers and became widely used during the 19th century.

== Steam-wheel ==
In 1805 Hornblower developed a steam-wheel.
