= Jonathan Hornblower (born 1717) =

- Born: 30 October 1717; Staffordshire, England
- Died: 7 December 1780 (aged 63); Cornwall, England
- Spouse: Ann Carter (m. 1743)
- Children: 13, including Jabez and Jonathan Jr.
- Parent: Joseph Hornblower (father)
- Relatives: Josiah Hornblower (brother)
- Engineering career
- Discipline: Civil

Jonathan Hornblower (30 October 1717 – 7 December 1780) was an English pioneer of steam power, the son of Joseph Hornblower and brother of Josiah Hornblower, two fellow steam pioneers.

Jonathan was born in Staffordshire on 30 October 1717, the eldest of the four children of steam pioneer Joseph and Rebecca (née Haywood) Hornblower. Joseph Hornblower was an installer of Newcomen steam engines in the Cornish mines and taught his children the same trade. Jonathan eventually took over from his father around 1740 and moved to live and work in Cornwall, where he built and installed Newcomen engines at several mines.

He married Ann Carter of Broseley, Shropshire, a lawyer's daughter, on 16 July 1743 and fathered thirteen children, all given biblical names beginning with J. Both Jabez Carter Hornblower and Jonathan Hornblower Jnr were to continue the family's steam engineering tradition, assisted by the fact that Thomas Newcomen was like the Hornblowers active in Baptist church life. Jonathan Snr died in Cornwall on 7 December 1780.
