= William B. Hornblower =

American judge (1851–1914)

William Hornblower
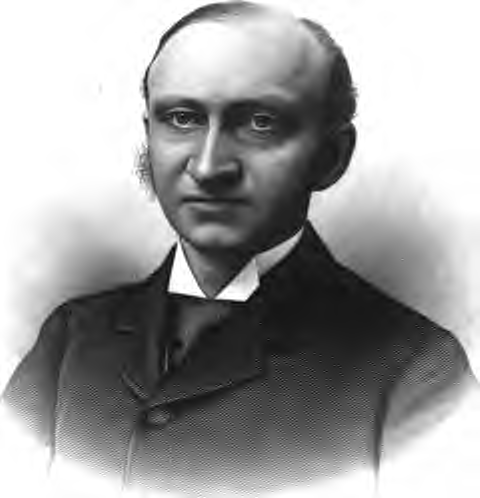

Personal details
- Born: William Butler Hornblower; May 13, 1851 Paterson, New Jersey, U.S.
- Died: June 16, 1914 (aged 63) Litchfield, Connecticut, U.S.
- Party: Democratic
- Education: College of New Jersey (now called Princeton University) (BA); Columbia University (LLB)

William Butler Hornblower (May 13, 1851 – June 16, 1914) was a New York jurist who served on the New York Court of Appeals. He was unsuccessfully nominated to the United States Supreme Court by President Grover Cleveland in 1893.

== Early life and education ==
William Butler Hornblower was born in Paterson, New Jersey, in 1851. He was the son of William Henry Hornblower, a Presbyterian minister, and his wife, Mathilda Butler. Hornblower was the descendant of an old American family; his grandfather, Joseph Coerten Hornblower, was chief justice of the New Jersey Supreme Court and his great-grandfather, Josiah Hornblower, was a member of the Continental Congress. In 1882 he married Sandra C. Sanford, with whom he had three children. After Sandra died, Hornblower married her sister, Emily Sanford Nelson, who was herself a widow. Hornblower graduated from the College of New Jersey (now Princeton University) in 1871 and Columbia Law School in 1875.

== Legal and political career ==
After graduating from Columbia, he practiced law with the New York bankruptcy law firm of Carter & Eaton until 1888, when he and two partners formed their own firm. A lifelong member of the Democratic Party, in 1890 he was appointed by New York governor David B. Hill to a commission on state constitutional amendments. Hornblower worked to defeat Isaac H. Maynard, Hill's preferred candidate for a seat on the New York Court of Appeals, in 1891, earning Hill's enmity.

On September 19, 1893, President Grover Cleveland nominated Hornblower as an associate justice of the Supreme Court of the United States, following the death of Samuel Blatchford. The United States Senate Judiciary Committee considered the nomination, but took no recorded action. The president again nominated Hornblower on December 5, 1893, and this time, the committee reported the nomination to the full Senate with a recommendation against confirmation on January 8, 1894. Both of New York's senators, one of whom was Hill, opposed the nomination, as did several pro-silver Democratic senators. The Senate rejected Hornblower's nomination on January 15, 1894, by a vote of 30 to 24.

Following his defeat, Hornblower returned to his successful New York law practice. In 1904, he was elected President of the New York State Bar Association. That same year, Hornblower served on a committee charged with consolidating the state's laws. In 1907, he formed a new law firm, Hornblower, Miller and Potter, a predecessor to the modern firm of Willkie Farr & Gallagher. In 1913, he was appointed president of the New York City Bar Association. Shortly before his death, Hornblower was appointed to a seat on the New York Court of Appeals, but served for just ten weeks.
