= Joseph Coerten Hornblower =

American judge

- Born: May 7, 1777; Belleville, New Jersey, U.S.
- Died: June 11, 1864 (aged 87); Belleville, New Jersey, U.S.
- Occupation(s): Lawyer, judge, politician, and professor
- Children: 8
- Father: Josiah Hornblower

Joseph Coerten Hornblower (May 7, 1777 – June 11, 1864) was an American lawyer and jurist from Belleville, New Jersey. He was the chief justice of the New Jersey Supreme Court.

== Early life and education ==
Hornblower was born on May 7, 1777, in Belleville, New Jersey, and lived there for his entire life. His parents were Josiah and Elizabeth (née Kingsland) Hornblower. Josiah Hornblower was a prominent engineer and mine operator who served in the Continental Congress.

As a child, Joseph's health was poor, so he was educated at home. He had a "stroke of paralysis" at the age of 16 that affected his memory. But he read for the law with an attorney in Newark and was admitted to the bar in 1803.

Later in his life, Princeton University conferred him with an honorary degree of Legum Doctor on September 30, 1841.

== Career ==
=== Law and political career ===
He became a prominent lawyer and politically active as a member of the Democratic-Republican Party. However, this was the Era of Good Feelings, and party politics were minimal.

When Hornblower was a Presidential elector for James Monroe in 1820, there was only one vote for any other candidate. He also supported other civic and religious activities. In 1816 he was one of the founders of the American Bible Society. In 1845 he aided in establishing the New Jersey Historical Society and served as its president from then until his death in 1864.

=== Chief Justice ===
In November 1832, Hornblower was named to the state's Supreme Court as its chief justice. He was re-elected in 1839 and served until 1846. When New Jersey rewrote the state's Constitution in 1844, he was an active member of the convention.

In 1836, Chief Justice Hornblower wrote an unpublished opinion in New Jersey vs. Sheriff of Burlington that was later used to argue a legal precedent against the Fugitive Slave Act of 1850. He allowed the accused Alexander Helmsley who was being held as a fugitive slave to be released. He argued the state law that the accused was being held under was unconstitutional given the New Jersey state constitution.

=== Later career ===
When he stepped down from the bench, he became a professor of law at Princeton Law School in 1846 and returned to his interest in political activity.

Hornblower's political interests became directed toward the nascent Republican Party. He was chairman of the New Jersey delegation and one of the vice-presidents of the 1856 Republican National Convention that nominated John C. Fremont for U.S. President.

== Personal life ==
Hornblower had eight children, including:

- William Henry Hornblower – Presbyterian minister who was the father of United States Supreme Court nominee William B. Hornblower
- Emily – wife of Colonel Alexander McWhorter Cumming, a long-serving Mayor of Princeton, New Jersey
- Mary – wife of Joseph P. Bradley, Associate Justice of the United States Supreme Court

He was friends with Chief Justice John Jay.

== Death ==
Hornblower died at home in Belleville, New Jersey, on June 11, 1864.
