= Edward A. Bradford =

American lawyer

Edward Bradford

Personal details
- Born: September 17, 1813 Plainfield, Connecticut, U.S.
- Died: November 22, 1872 (aged 59) Paris, France
- Party: Whig
- Education: Yale University (BA); Harvard University (LLB)

Edward Anthony Bradford (September 17, 1813 – November 22, 1872) was a lawyer and unsuccessful nominee to the United States Supreme Court.

== Biography ==
Born in Plainfield, Connecticut, Bradford graduated from Yale University (1833) and Harvard Law School (1837) before establishing a law practice in New Orleans, Louisiana.

As a Yale senior and Class of 1833 Salutatorian, E.A. Bradford wrote a letter to his mother about 7th US President Andrew Jackson's visit to the Yale campus. He states, "Jackson left town this morning for Hartford. He arrived here Saturday afternoon from New York + remained over Sunday, thus giving me a full opportunity to inspect him. He was attended by Mr. Van Buren (VP) … (NY Governor) + other distinguished characters."

Bradford was nominated by President Millard Fillmore as an Associate Justice of the Supreme Court of the United States on August 16, 1852, to succeed John McKinley. The Senate declined to act on the nomination before the session ended and Bradford was not re-nominated.

Bradford became ill with an unspecified disease in 1869 and left his law practice to seek treatment in Europe. After stays in England and Germany, he died in Paris, France, on November 22, 1872.
