= Bingham v. Cabot (1795) =

- Supreme Court of the United States

Argued February 21, 23, 25–28, March 2, 1795 Decided March 2, 1795
- Full case name: Bingham v. Cabot
- Citations: 3 U.S. 19 (more) 3 Dall. 19

Holding
- Mixed seriatim opinions.

Court membership
- Chief Justice John Jay Associate Justices James Wilson · William Cushing; John Blair Jr. · James Iredell; William Paterson

Bingham v. Cabot, 3 U.S. (3 Dall.) 19 (1795), was a United States Supreme Court case involving the Cabot family, a wealthy Yankee shipping family from New England. In the case the court held in a mixed seriatim opinion:

On the return of the record (to which were annexed several depositions and papers produced in the court below, as well as the papers referred to in the bill of exceptions) the following errors were assigned, the defendant in error pleaded in nullo est erratum, and issue was thereupon joined:

1. That judgment had been given for the plaintiff, instead of the defendant below, on the 3rd Count.
2. That the circuit court, proceeding as a court of common law, in an action on the case, for money had and received, etc., had no jurisdiction of the cause; the question, as it appears on the record, being a question of prize, or no prize, or wholly dependent thereon, and, as such, it was, exclusively of admiralty jurisdiction.
3. That the evidence referred to in the bill of exceptions ought not to have been rejected on the trial of the cause.

The judges, after some advisement, delivered their opinions seriatim.

== See also ==
- Bingham v. Cabot (1798)
