= Hylton v. United States =

- Supreme Court of the United States

Argued February 23, 1796 Decided March 8, 1796
- Full case name: Daniel Hylton, Plaintiff in Error v. the United States
- Citations: 3 U.S. 171 (more) 3 Dall. 171; 1 L. Ed. 556; 1796 U.S. LEXIS 397; 2 A.F.T.R. (P-H) 2155

Case history
- Prior: Defendant convicted, Circuit Court for the District of Virginia
- Subsequent: None

Holding
- A tax on the possession of goods is not a "direct" tax, which must be apportioned under Article I of the Constitution.

Court membership
- Chief Justice Oliver Ellsworth Associate Justices James Wilson · William Cushing; James Iredell · William Paterson; Samuel Chase

Case opinions
- Seriatim: Chase
- Seriatim: Paterson
- Seriatim: Iredell
- Seriatim: Wilson
- Ellsworth and Cushing took no part in the consideration or decision of the case.

Laws applied
- U.S. Const. art. I; An Act laying duties upon Carriages for the conveyance of Persons

Hylton v. United States, 3 U.S. (3 Dall.) 171 (1796), is an early United States Supreme Court case in which the Court held that a yearly tax on carriages did not violate the Article I, Section 2, Clause 3 and Article I, Section 9, Clause 4 requirements for the apportioning of direct taxes. The Court concluded that the carriage tax was not a direct tax, which would require apportionment among the states. The Court noted that a tax on land was an example of a direct tax that was contemplated by the Constitution.

The case is also significant for being the first case by the Supreme Court to rely on judicial review, later formally established by Marbury v. Madison (1803), to decide whether a statute of Congress was unconstitutional.

== Oral argument ==
An ill Alexander Hamilton argued before the Court on behalf of the government and claimed that the tax was a valid use of the power of Congress, in front of a very crowded gallery.

== Decision ==
=== Seriatim opinions ===
The justices at the time, rather than issuing a single opinion of the court, instead issued seriatim opinions, with each writing separately and in turn reading a separate analysis. Justice Chase wrote, "As I do not think the tax on carriages is a direct tax.... I am for affirming the judgment of the Circuit Court." Justice Paterson wrote, "All taxes on expenses or consumption are indirect taxes. A tax on carriages is of this kind, and of course is not a direct tax.... I am, therefore, of opinion, that the judgment rendered in the Circuit Court of Virginia ought to be affirmed." Justice Iredell wrote, "I am clearly of opinion this is not a direct tax in the sense of the Constitution, and therefore that the judgment ought to be affirmed." Justice Wilson wrote, "I shall now, however, only add, that my sentiments, in favor of the constitutionality of the tax in question, have not been changed."

=== Other comments ===
Regarding the definition of duties, Justice Samuel Chase wrote, "The term duty, is the most comprehensive next to the generic term tax; and practically in Great Britain, (whence we take our general ideas of taxes, duties, imposts, excises, customs, etc.) embraces taxes on stamps, tolls for passage, etc. etc. and is not confined to taxes on importation only."

On the issue of judicial review, he wrote, "As I do not think the tax on carriages is a direct tax, it is unnecessary, at this time, for me to determine, whether this court, constitutionally possesses the power to declare an act of Congress void, on the ground of its being made contrary to, and in violation of, the Constitution; but if the court have such power, I am free to declare, that I will never exercise it, but in a very clear case."

== Subsequent history ==
The court's interpretation of federal taxes on personal property as "indirect taxes" lasted until the 1895 case of Pollock v. Farmers' Loan & Trust Co. Writing for the majority in Pollock, Chief Justice Fuller explained, "We are of opinion that taxes on personal property, or on the income of personal property, are likewise direct taxes." The Congressional Research Service lists the Hylton decision as having been overruled by the Pollock decision.

In 1913, the Sixteenth Amendment was adopted, overruling Pollock relating to taxes on income from real estate and personal property. The Amendment did not address taxes on personal property itself. Writing for the majority in the 1916 case of Brushaber v. Union Pacific Railroad Co., Chief Justice White explained that the "Amendment contains nothing repudiating or challenging the ruling in the Pollock Case that the word 'direct' had a broader significance, since it embraced also taxes levied directly on personal property because of its ownership, and therefore the Amendment at least impliedly makes such wider significance a part of the Constitution...."

In 1916, while presiding over Stanton v. Baltic Mining Co., the Supreme Court said: "...the meaning of the 16th Amendment as interpreted in the Brushaber Case,... by the previous ruling it was settled that the provisions of the 16th Amendment conferred no new power of taxation."

== Use as precedent ==
In 2012, Chief Justice John Roberts cited Hylton v. United States as a precedent for deeming the mandate for individuals to buy health insurance contained in the Patient Protection and Affordable Care Act (as amended by the Health Care and Education Reconciliation Act of 2010) to be constitutional as a tax.

== See also ==
- List of United States Supreme Court cases, volume 3
- National Federation of Independent Business v. Sebelius
- Ware v. Hylton
