= United States Reports, volume 3 =

Supreme Court of the United States
- Interactive map of Supreme Court of the United States
- 38°53′26″N 77°00′16″W
- Established: March 4, 1789; 237 years ago
- Location: Washington, D.C.
- Coordinates: 38°53′26″N 77°00′16″W
- Composition method: Presidential nomination with Senate confirmation
- Authorised by: Constitution of the United States, Art. III, § 1
- Judge term length: life tenure, subject to impeachment and removal
- Number of positions: 9 (by statute)
- Website: supremecourt.gov

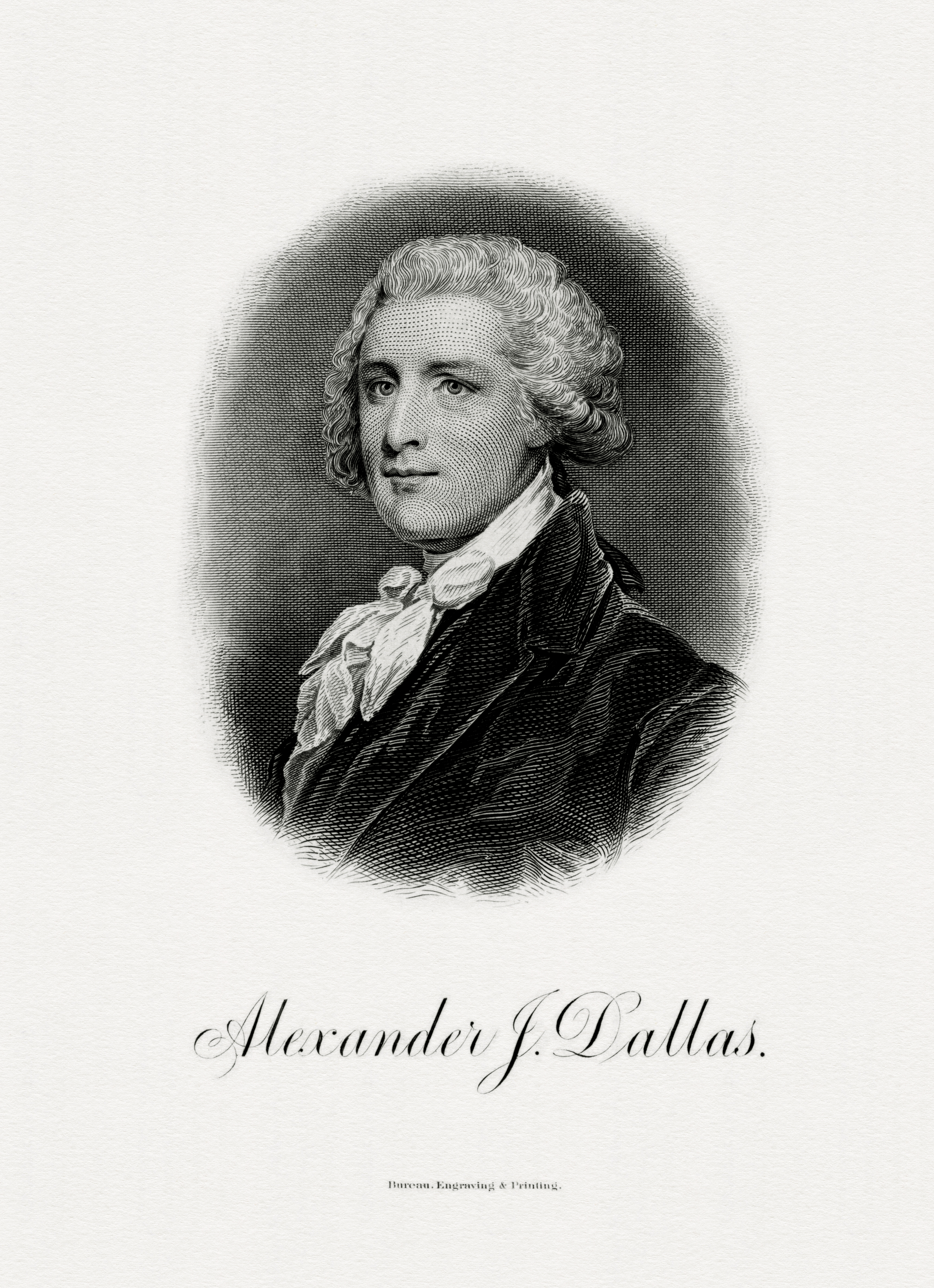
Alexander Dallas as Secretary of the Treasury (1814–1816)

This is a list of all the United States Supreme Court cases from volume 3 of the United States Reports, decided by the Supreme Court of the United States from 1794 to 1799. Case reports from other tribunals also appear in 3 U.S. (3 Dall.).

== Alexander Dallas and Dallas Reports ==
Not all of the cases reported in 3 U.S. (3 Dall.) are from the United States Supreme Court. Included are decisions from the Supreme Court of Pennsylvania, and the United States Circuit Court for the District of Pennsylvania. Alexander J. Dallas, a Philadelphia lawyer and later United States Secretary of the Treasury, had been in the business of reporting local law cases for newspapers and periodicals. When the US Supreme Court sat in Philadelphia from 1791 to 1800, he collected their cases as well, and later began compiling his case reports in a bound volume which he called Reports of cases ruled and adjudged in the courts of Pennsylvania, before and since the Revolution.

When the US Supreme Court along with the rest of the new federal government moved in 1791 from the former capital, New York City, to the nation's temporary capital in Philadelphia, Dallas was appointed the Supreme Court's first unofficial and unpaid Supreme Court Reporter. (Court reporters in that age received no salary, but were expected to profit from the publication and sale of their compiled decisions.) Dallas continued to collect and publish Pennsylvania and other decisions, adding federal Supreme Court cases to his reports. Dallas published four volumes of decisions during his tenure as Reporter, known as the Dallas Reports.

The Supreme Court moved to the new capital city of Washington D.C. in 1800. Dallas remained in Philadelphia; William Cranch then replaced him as Reporter of Decisions of the Supreme Court of the United States.

== Nominative Reports ==
In 1874, the U.S. government created the United States Reports, and retroactively numbered older privately published case reports as part of the new series. As a result, cases appearing in volumes 1–90 of U.S. Reports have dual citation forms; one for the volume number of U.S. Reports, and one for the volume number of the reports named for the relevant reporter of decisions (these are called "nominative reports"). As such, volumes 1–4 of United States Reports correspond to volumes 1–4 of Dallas Reports. The dual citation form of, for example, Hunter v. Fairfax's Devisee is 3 U.S. (3 Dall.) 305 (1796).

== Courts in 3 U.S. (3 Dall.) ==
The cases reported in 3 U.S. (3 Dall.) come from the Supreme Court of the United States, the Supreme Court of Pennsylvania (Pa.), and the United States Circuit Court for the District of Pennsylvania (C.C.D. Pa.).

== Justices of the Supreme Court at the time of 3 U.S. (3 Dall.) ==
The Supreme Court is established by Article III, Section 1 of the Constitution of the United States, which says: "The judicial Power of the United States, shall be vested in one supreme Court . . .". The size of the Court is not specified; the Constitution leaves it to Congress to set the number of justices. Under the Judiciary Act of 1789 Congress originally fixed the number of justices at six (one chief justice and five associate justices). Since 1789 Congress has varied the size of the Court from six to seven, nine, ten, and back to nine justices (always including one chief justice).

When the cases in 3 U.S. (3 Dall.) were decided, the Court comprised six of the following eleven justices at one time:

Portrait	Justice	Office	Home State	Succeeded	Date confirmed by the Senate (Vote)	Tenure on Supreme Court
	John Jay	Chief Justice	New York	original seat when the Court was established	September 26, 1789 (Acclamation)	October 19, 1789 – June 29, 1795 (Resigned)
	John Rutledge	Chief Justice	South Carolina	original seat when the Court was established	September 26, 1789 (Acclamation)	February 15, 1790 – March 4, 1791 (Resigned)
	William Cushing	Associate Justice	Massachusetts	original seat when the Court was established	September 26, 1789 (Acclamation)	February 2, 1790 – September 13, 1810 (Died)
	James Wilson	Associate Justice	Pennsylvania	original seat when the Court was established	September 26, 1789 (Acclamation)	October 5, 1789 – August 21, 1798 (Died)
	John Blair	Associate Justice	Virginia	original seat when the Court was established	September 26, 1789 (Acclamation)	February 2, 1790 – October 25, 1795 (Resigned)
	James Iredell	Associate Justice	North Carolina	original seat when the Court was established	February 10, 1790 (Acclamation)	May 12, 1790 – October 20, 1799 (Died)
	Thomas Johnson	Associate Justice	Maryland	John Rutledge (after Rutledge's first term on the Court)	November 7, 1791 (Acclamation)	August 6, 1792 – January 16, 1793 (Resigned)
	William Paterson	Associate Justice	New Jersey	Thomas Johnson	March 4, 1793 (Acclamation)	March 11, 1793 – September 8, 1806 (Died)
	Samuel Chase	Associate Justice	Maryland	John Blair, Jr.	January 27, 1796 (Acclamation)	February 4, 1796 – June 19, 1811 (Died)
	Oliver Ellsworth	Chief Justice	Connecticut	John Rutledge (after Rutledge's second term on the Court)	March 4, 1796 (21–1)	March 8, 1796 – December 15, 1800 (Resigned)
	Bushrod Washington	Associate Justice	Virginia	James Wilson	December 20, 1798 (Acclamation)	November 9, 1798 (Recess Appointment) – November 26, 1829 (Died)

== Notable Cases in 3 U.S. (3 Dall.) ==
=== Calder v. Bull ===
In Calder v. Bull, 3 U.S. (3 Dall.) 386 (1798), the Supreme Court decided four important points of constitutional law:

- First, the ex post facto clause of the United States Constitution applies to criminal laws that have at least one of four effects: (a) creates a crime and penalty that before passage of the law which was not illegal; (b) makes an existing crime of greater severity than it was when committed; (c) inflicts a greater punishment to an existing crime than applied before the law; (d) changes rules of evidence to make less, or different, evidence than the law required at the time of the crime to convict the offender.
- Second, the Court lacked authority to nullify state laws that may violate that state's own constitution.
- Third, no one should be compelled to do what the laws do not require; nor to refrain from acts which the laws permit.
- Fourth, a state legislative act does not violate of the ex post facto clause if there is nothing done by the parties that is affected by the state law.

=== Georgia v. Brailsford ===
In Georgia v. Brailsford, 3 U.S. (3 Dall.) 1 (1794), is significant as the only reported jury trial held by the US Supreme Court. During the American Revolution, the state of Georgia passed a law that sequestered debts owed to British creditors. The Treaty of Paris, however, asserted the validity of debts held by creditors on both sides. The case was filed directly in the United States Supreme Court, rather than in a lower trial court, under the Supreme Court's constitutionally defined original jurisdiction.

=== Hollingsworth v. Virginia ===
In Hollingsworth v. Virginia, 3 U.S. (3 Dall.) 378 (1798) the Court held the President of the United States has no formal role in the process of amending the United States Constitution, and that the Eleventh Amendment was binding on cases already pending before its ratification.

== Citation style ==
Under the Judiciary Act of 1789 the federal court structure at the time comprised District Courts, which had general trial jurisdiction; Circuit Courts, which had mixed trial and appellate (from the US District Courts) jurisdiction; and the United States Supreme Court, which had appellate jurisdiction over the federal District and Circuit courts—and for certain issues over state courts. The Supreme Court also had limited original jurisdiction (i.e., in which cases could be filed directly with the Supreme Court without first having been heard by a lower federal or state court). There were one or more federal District Courts and/or Circuit Courts in each state, territory, or other geographical region.

Bluebook citation style is used for case names, citations, and jurisdictions.

- "C.C.D." = United States Circuit Court for the District of . . .
  - e.g.,"C.C.D.N.J." = United States Circuit Court for the District of New Jersey
- "D." = United States District Court for the District of . . .
  - e.g.,"D. Mass." = United States District Court for the District of Massachusetts
- "E." = Eastern; "M." = Middle; "N." = Northern; "S." = Southern; "W." = Western
  - e.g.,"C.C.S.D.N.Y." = United States Circuit Court for the Southern District of New York
  - e.g.,"M.D. Ala." = United States District Court for the Middle District of Alabama
- "Ct. Cl." = United States Court of Claims
- The abbreviation of a state's name alone indicates the highest appellate court in that state's judiciary at the time.
  - e.g.,"Pa." = Supreme Court of Pennsylvania
  - e.g.,"Me." = Supreme Judicial Court of Maine

== List of cases in 3 U.S. (3 Dall.) ==
=== Cases of the Supreme Court of the United States ===
Case	Page & year	Opinions of the Court	Lower court	Disposition
Georgia v. Brailsford	1 (1794)	Jay (charge to the jury)	original	jury verdict for defendants
Glass v. The Sloop Betsey	6 (1794)	Jay	D. Md.	Reversed
United States v. Hamilton	17 (1795)	Wilson	D. Pa.	certification
Bingham v. Cabot (1795)	19 (1795)	seriatim: Paterson, Iredell, Wilson, Cushing	C.C.D. Mass.	reversed
United States v. Lawrence	42 (1795)	per curiam	D.N.Y.	mandamus denied
Penhallow v. Doane's Administrators	54 (1795)	Cushing	C.C.D.N.H.	reversed
United States v. Peters	121 (1795)	Rutledge	D. Pa.	prohibition issued
Talbot v. Jansen	133 (1795)	seriatim: Paterson, Iredell	C.C.D.S.C.	affirmed
Hylton v. United States	171 (1796)	seriatim: Chase, Paterson, Iredell	C.C.D. Va.	affirmed
Hills v. Ross	184 (1796)	per curiam	C.C.D. Ga.	continued
McDonough v. Dannery	188 (1796)	per curiam	C.C.D. Mass.	affirmed
Ware v. Hylton	199 (1796)	seriatim: Chase, Wilson, Cushing	C.C.D. Va.	reversed
Geyer v. Michel	285 (1796)	per curiam	C.C.D.S.C.	affirmed
United States v. La Vengeance	297 (1796)	Ellsworth	C.C.D.N.Y.	affirmed
Cotton v. Wallace	302 (1796)	per curiam	C.C.D. Ga.	mandate granted
Hunter v. Fairfax's Devisee	305 (1796)	per curiam	not indicated	continued
Arcambel v. Wiseman	306 (1796)	per curiam	C.C.D.R.I.	remittitur granted
Moodie v. The Ship Alfred	307 (1796)	per curiam	not indicated	affirmed
Olney v. Arnold	308 (1796)	Ellsworth	R.I. Super. Ct.	affirmed
Moodie v. The Ship Phoebe Anne	319 (1796)	Ellsworth	C.C.D.S.C.	affirmed
Grayson v. Virginia	320 (1796)	Ellsworth	original	subpoena granted
Wiscart v. Dauchy	321 (1796)	per curiam	C.C.D. Va.	affirmed
Hills v. Ross	331 (1796)	seriatim: Ellsworth, Iredell, Chase	C.C.D. Ga.	reversed
Del Col v. Arnold	333 (1796)	per curiam	C.C.D.S.C.	affirmed
Jennings v. The Brig Perseverance	336 (1797)	seriatim: Paterson, Chase	C.C.D.R.I.	affirmed
Huger v. South Carolina	339 (1797)	seriatim: Iredell, Chase	original	petition granted
Clerke v. Harwood	342 (1797)	per curiam	Md.	affirmed
Brown v. Van Braam	344 (1797)	seriatim: Wilson, Paterson, Chase	C.C.D.R.I.	affirmed
Fenemore v. United States	357 (1797)	seriatim: Chase, Iredell, Cushing, Ellsworth, Paterson	C.C.D.N.J.	affirmed
Brown v. Barry	365 (1797)	Ellsworth	C.C.D. Va.	affirmed
Emory v. Grenough	369 (1797)	per curiam	C.C.D. Mass.	dismissed
Hamilton v. Moore	371 (1797)	per curiam	C.C.D. Ga.	dismissed
Hollingsworth v. Virginia	378 (1798)	per curiam, and Chase	not indicated	dismissed
Bingham v. Cabot (1798)	382 (1798)	per curiam	C.C.D. Mass.	dismissed
Jones v. Le Tombe	384 (1798)	per curiam	original	rule made absolute
Calder v. Bull	386 (1798)	seriatim: Chase, Paterson, Iredell, Cushing	Conn.	affirmed
Wilson v. Daniel	401 (1798)	seriatim: Ellsworth, Iredell, Chase	C.C.D. Va.	affirmed
Dewhurst v. Coulthard	409 (1799)	per curiam	C.C.D.N.Y.	dismissed
Ex parte Hallowell	410 (1799)	per curiam	original	Hallowell admitted to bar of Court
Fowler v. Lindsey	411 (1799)	seriatim: Washington, Paterson, Cushing	C.C.D. Conn.	rule discharged
Clarke v. Russel	415 (1799)	Ellsworth	C.C.D.R.I.	reversed
Sims' Lessee v. Irvine	425 (1799)	seriatim: Ellsworth, Iredell	C.C.D. Pa.	affirmed

=== Cases of other tribunals ===
Case	Page and year	Court
Respublica v. Cobbett	467 (Pa. 1798)	Supreme Court of Pennsylvania
Anonymous	477 (Pa. 1798)	Supreme Court of Pennsylvania
Camberling v. McCall	477 (Pa. 1798)	Supreme Court of Pennsylvania
Coxe v. McClenachan	478 (Pa. 1798)	Supreme Court of Pennsylvania
Pemberton's Lessee v. Hicks	479 (Pa. 1798)	Supreme Court of Pennsylvania
McKee's Lessee v. Pfout	486 (Pa. 1798)	Supreme Court of Pennsylvania
Respublica v. Wray	490 (Pa. 1799)	Supreme Court of Pennsylvania
Murgatroyd v. Crawford	491 (Pa. 1799)	Supreme Court of Pennsylvania
Breckbill v. Turnpike Company	496 (Pa. 1799)	Supreme Court of Pennsylvania
Dallas v. Chaloner's Executors	500 (Pa. 1799)	Supreme Court of Pennsylvania
Wharton's Executors v. Fitzgerald	503 (Pa. 1799)	Supreme Court of Pennsylvania
Reed v. Ingraham	505 (Pa. 1799)	Supreme Court of Pennsylvania
Peterson v. Willing	506 (Pa. 1799)	Supreme Court of Pennsylvania
Roberts v. Wheelen	506 (Pa. 1799)	Supreme Court of Pennsylvania
Pollock v. Donaldson	510 (C.C.D. Pa. 1799)	United States Circuit Court for the District of Pennsylvania
Hurst v. Hurst	512 (C.C.D. Pa. 1799)	United States Circuit Court for the District of Pennsylvania
United States v. Insurgents of Pennsylvania	513 (C.C.D. Pa. 1799)	United States Circuit Court for the District of Pennsylvania
United States v. Fries	515 (C.C.D. Pa. 1799)	United States Circuit Court for the District of Pennsylvania

== See also ==
- Certificate of division
