= Clerke v. Harwood =

- Supreme Court of the United States

Decided February 11, 1797
- Full case name: Clerke v. Harwood
- Citations: 3 U.S. 342 (more) 3 Dall. 342; 1 L. Ed. 628

Court membership
- Chief Justice Oliver Ellsworth Associate Justices James Wilson · William Cushing; James Iredell · William Paterson; Samuel Chase

Clerke v. Harwood, 3 U.S. (3 Dall.) 342 (1797), was a United States Supreme Court case that followed the court's decision in Ware v. Hylton, concerning debts owed to British subjects. In the Ware case, the Supreme Court had reversed a decision by the Maryland Court of Appeals, the state's highest court, and restored the decision of a Maryland trial court.

In the Clerke case, the Supreme Court considered what should happen to cases presenting a similar question, once the holding of their appeals-court decision had been reversed. Should they be sent back to the Maryland Court of Appeals, or directly back to the trial court? The Supreme Court also considered who should pay the court costs incurred before the Maryland Court of Appeals—the winner before that court, whose victory had since been reversed, or the ultimate winner of the entire case?

In a short per curiam opinion, the U.S. Supreme Court held that the case should be sent directly back to the Maryland trial court, with the ultimate losing party paying all court costs, even before the Maryland Court of Appeals, where it had won a temporary victory.

== See also ==
- List of United States Supreme Court cases, volume 3
