= Glass v. The Sloop Betsey =

- Supreme Court of the United States

Argued February 8, 10–12, 1794 Decided February 18, 1794
- Full case name: Alexander S. Glass, et al., Appellants v. The Sloop Betsey, et al.
- Citations: 3 U.S. 6 (more) 3 Dall. 6; 1 L. Ed. 485; 1794 U.S. LEXIS 103

Holding
- A foreign country cannot establish a court within the territory of the United States without the authorization of a treaty.

Court membership
- Chief Justice John Jay Associate Justices James Wilson · William Cushing; John Blair Jr. · James Iredell; William Paterson

Case opinion
- Majority: Jay, joined by unanimous

Glass v. The Sloop Betsey, 3 U.S. (3 Dall.) 6 (1794), was a United States Supreme Court case in which the Court held that French consuls in the United States cannot hear cases to determine the property rights of foreign ships captured by French vessels and brought into American ports.

== Background ==
Under what would later be called public international law, neutral countries are required to hear prize cases, which are about whether a ship was captured legally by a belligerent. The United States proclaimed itself a neutral country in 1793 regarding the French Revolutionary Wars. However, United States federal courts decided that prize cases were not within Article III jurisdiction and refused to hear them. When the United States refused to hear these cases, it was not abiding by the requirements of being neutral.

Relying on treaties between the United States and France from 1778, the French envoy Edmond-Charles Genêt decided to have captured ships brought to United States ports, where he intended to have their prize cases decided. When the United States courts refused to hear the cases, Genêt had the cases decided by French consuls in the United States instead.

In this case, Glass was an American shareholder in a captured Swedish vessel and sued to determine his rights in district court.

== Supreme Court ==
The Supreme Court issued an opinion on February 18, 1794. Jay's opinion said that the French consuls could not hear the cases because foreign countries cannot establish courts within the territory of the United States without the authorization of a treaty. Absent that, the Supreme Court determined that the District Courts of the United States have the exclusive right to hear admiralty cases.

== Later developments ==
After this opinion, Chief Justice John Jay received praise for his decision and was sent to Europe to negotiate a treaty regarding admiralty rights, the Jay Treaty. While there, he was elected Governor of New York and left the high court. Accordingly, The Sloop Betsy was the last decision Jay wrote as a justice.

This case has since been described as a "purely political question" that Jay answered in support of the current administration. It has also been called an assertion of sovereignty by the then-young United States.
