= Georgia v. Brailsford (1794) =

- Supreme Court of the United States

Argued February 4–7, 1794 Decided February 7, 1794
- Full case name: State of Georgia v. Samuel Brailsford & others
- Citations: 3 U.S. 1 (more) 3 Dall. 1; 1 L. Ed. 483; 1794 U.S. LEXIS 102

Holding
- Sequestration of debts by states during the American Revolution did not permanently vest those debts in the states.

Court membership
- Chief Justice John Jay Associate Justices James Wilson · William Cushing; John Blair Jr. · James Iredell; William Paterson

Case opinion
- Majority: Jay, joined by unanimous

Georgia v. Brailsford, 3 U.S. (3 Dall.) 1 (1794), was an early United States Supreme Court case holding that debts sequestered but not declared forfeit by states during the American Revolution could be recovered by bondholders. It is the only reported jury trial in the history of the Supreme Court.

== Background ==
During the American Revolution, the state of Georgia passed a law that sequestered debts owed to British creditors. The Treaty of Paris between the United States and Great Britain asserted the validity of debts held by creditors on both sides. Samuel Brailsford, a British subject and holder of such a debt, attempted to recover from Georgia resident James Spalding. The case was filed directly in the United States Supreme Court, rather than in a lower court, under its constitutionally defined original jurisdiction. Georgia intervened in the Supreme Court, claiming that the debt was owed instead to the state. Brailsford was joined by Messrs. Hopton and Powell, residents of South Carolina, who were partners in the debt. Because the Court was trying a common law dispute, it impaneled a jury for the case.

== Decision ==
The Court concluded that the sequestration law did not transfer the debt interest to the state. After being advised of that opinion, the jury found for the defendants.

== Power of juries ==
Chief Justice Jay's instructions to the jury have attracted much interest surrounding their implications for jury nullification. Jay noted it as a "good old rule" that juries should judge questions of fact while deferring to the court on questions of law; yet he observed that the jury could, if it chose, judge both to arrive at a decision. As mentioned, the jury neither challenged the Court's conclusions of law nor needed to examine the facts, which the parties had agreed upon.

Subsequent jurisprudence has tended to discount the Brailsford court's view. In United States v. Morris (1851), Justice Benjamin Robbins Curtis commented on the apparent inconsistency of Jay's recorded instructions, going so far as to suggest that the record was inaccurate and, in any case, not in line with recent English or American law. Sparf v. United States (1895) repeated Curtis's doubts and found that federal courts had no obligation to give similar instructions.

Stanford Law School fellow Lochlan F. Shelfer has examined the case record in depth. He notes that the jury was a special jury, drawn from a pool of merchants informed on matters of law relevant to the case. Their relation to the court, then, was different from that of a typical fact-finding jury. Shelfer concludes that the instructions were neither anomalous nor an endorsement of jury nullification but rather reflected the immaturity of American merchant law and the reliance of courts on experts.

== See also ==
- Jury nullification in the United States
