= Brown v. Barry =

- Supreme Court of the United States

Argued August 8–9, 1797 Decided August 15, 1797
- Full case name: Brown v. Barry
- Citations: 3 U.S. 365 (more) 3 Dall. 365; 1 L. Ed. 638; 1797 U.S. LEXIS 205

Court membership
- Chief Justice Oliver Ellsworth Associate Justices James Wilson · William Cushing; James Iredell · William Paterson; Samuel Chase

Case opinion
- Majority: Ellsworth, joined by unanimous

Brown v. Barry, 3 U.S. (3 Dall.) 365 (1797), was a United States Supreme Court case in which the court determined the following:

The suspension of a statute for a limited time is not a repeal of it.

The intention of the legislature when discovered must prevail, any rule of construction. declared by previous acts, to the contrary notwithstanding.

In an action on a bill of exchange, which had not been protested for non-payment, it is not necessary to aver in the declaration that the bill had been protested for non-acceptance.

As to bills of exchange drawn in the United States payable in Europe, the custom of merchants in this country does not ordinarily require, to recover on a protest for non-payment, that a protest for non-acceptance shall be produced, though the bills were not accepted.

Where the action is for foreign money, and its value is not averred, a verdict cures the defect.

The reason that debet for foreign money is ill, is the uncertainty of its value; and this is cured by a verdict.
