= Ware v. Hylton =

- Supreme Court of the United States

Argued February 6–12, 1796 Decided March 7, 1796
- Full case name: Ware, administrator of Jones, Plaintiff in Error v. Hylton et al.
- Citations: 3 U.S. 199 (more) 3 Dall. 199; 1 L. Ed. 568

Case history
- Prior: Appeal from the Virginia Circuit Court

Holding
- Treaties made under the Constitution supersede state law.

Court membership
- Chief Justice vacant Associate Justices James Wilson · William Cushing; James Iredell · William Paterson; Samuel Chase

Case opinions
- Seriatim: Chase
- Seriatim: Iredell
- Seriatim: Wilson
- Seriatim: Cushing
- Dissent: Paterson
- Ellsworth took no part in the consideration or decision of the case.

Laws applied
- U.S. Const. art. VI, Treaty of Paris

Ware v. Hylton, 3 U.S. (3 Dall.) 199 (1796), also known as the British Debt Case, was a decision of the United States Supreme Court holding that treaties take precedence over state law under the U.S. Constitution. It was the first Supreme Court case concerned with treaties, the first to rule that treaty provisions were as binding as domestic U.S. law, and the first to affirm the supremacy of federal law over state law. Ware is also notable for articulating the legal doctrine that would later be known as judicial review, whereby federal courts have the authority to settle conflicts of law.

== Background ==
The Treaty of Paris of 1783, which ended the Revolutionary War between Great Britain and the United States, provided that creditors of both countries should "meet no lawful impediment" when recovering "bona fide" debts from one another.

A resident of the state of Virginia owed a debt to a British subject; the state had enacted a law allowing debtors to British creditors to discharge their debts, on the grounds that the debt was owed to an alien enemy. The administrator of the British creditor sued in federal court to recover what was owed, citing the relevant provisions of the treaty.

== Decision ==
The Supreme Court struck down the Virginia law primarily on the grounds that it violated the Supremacy Clause of the U.S. Constitution, which establishes that federal laws and treaties are the supreme law of the land. The Treaty of Paris, which was ratified pursuant to the Constitution, therefore had the force of domestic federal law and superseded the conflicting state law; this was the first time the clause had been explicitly cited by the court.

Four justices released their opinions seriatim (one after another) with no majority opinion, a practice that would continue until the Marshall Court. Justice James Iredell delivered the controlling opinion of the Court, which is often the most cited:

The treaty of peace concluded between the United States and Great Britain, in 1783, enabled British creditors to recover debts previously owing to them by American citizens, notwithstanding a payment into a state treasury, under a state law of sequestration. An individual citizen of one state cannot set up the violation of a public treaty, by the other contracting party, to avoid an obligation arising under such treaty; the power to declare a treaty void, for such cause, rests solely with the government, which may, or may not, exercise its option in the premises.

The Court decision was among the earliest to discuss U.S. obligations under international law, then called the law of nations. Justice James Wilson asserted that upon becoming a sovereign state, the U.S. was "bound to receive the law of nations, in its modern state of purity and refinement"; thus, Virginia's law was void since it did not conform to the international custom of honoring treaties. Wilson further held that even private citizens had a duty to fulfill treaty obligations, so that even if the confiscation of debts was customary in international law, it would have been precluded by the Treaty of Paris. Justice Samuel Chase concurred, holding that all state laws in conflict with federal treaties were "prostrate" before them. Chase's opinion featured the earliest articulation of international law in U.S. federal court, drawing from the writings of Swiss jurist and international lawyer Emer de Vattel:

The first [general law] is universal, or established by the general consent of mankind, and binds all nations. The second [conventional law] is founded on express consent, and is not universal, and only binds those nations that have assented to it. The third [customary law] is founded on TACIT consent; and is only obligatory on those nations, who have adopted it.

Ware is also notable for having been argued on both sides by several prominent legal minds of the time, including Patrick Henry, John Wickham, and John Marshall, who would later become Chief Justice of the Court. Although he represented the losing side, Marshall's argument won him great admiration at the time of its delivery, increasing his reputation as a lawyer and legal scholar.

== Legacy ==
The oral argument in the case was reenacted at Mount Vernon in 2011, with U.S. Supreme Court Associate Justice Samuel Alito presiding. Historic Mount Vernon and the U.S. Supreme Court Historical Society cosponsored the event.

== See also ==
- Hylton v. United States
- Clerke v. Harwood
