= Jennings v. The Perseverance =

- Supreme Court of the United States

Argued February 10, 1797 Decided February 13, 1797
- Full case name: Jennings, et al., Plaintiffs in Error v. The Brig Perseverance, et al.
- Citations: 3 U.S. 336 (more) 3 Dall. 336; 1 L. Ed. 625; 1797 U.S. LEXIS 200

Court membership
- Chief Justice Oliver Ellsworth Associate Justices James Wilson · William Cushing; James Iredell · William Paterson; Samuel Chase

Case opinions
- Majority: Paterson
- Concurrence: Chase

Jennings v. The Perseverance, 3 U.S. (3 Dall.) 336 (1797), was a United States Supreme Court case holding that: "The decision in Wiscart v. Dauchy, (3 P. 321,) confirmed. An objection that counsel fees were allowed in the court below as part of the damages, can not be entertained unless the fact appears by the record. If a prize is sold by agreement, and the money stopped in the hands of the marshal, by a third person, not a party to the agreement, increased damages are not allowed, but only interest on the debt."
