= United States v. Lawrence =

- Supreme Court of the United States

Argued February 18, 1795 Decided March 3, 1795
- Full case name: United States v. Judge Lawrence
- Citations: 3 U.S. 42 (more) 3 Dall. 42; 1 L. Ed. 502; 1795 U.S. LEXIS 328

Holding
- the Supreme Court cannot normally compel a federal trial judge to proceed in a case which he feels is lacking sufficient evidence to proceed

Court membership
- Chief Justice John Jay Associate Justices James Wilson · William Cushing; John Blair Jr. · James Iredell; William Paterson

United States v. Lawrence, 3 U.S. (3 Dall.) 42 (1795), was a United States Supreme Court case determining that the Supreme Court cannot normally compel a federal trial judge to proceed in a case which he feels is lacking sufficient evidence to proceed. In the case, the court held:

Where a judge of the district court, acting in his judicial capacity, determined that evidence was not sufficient to authorize him to proceed in a case before him, this Court has no power to compel him to decide according to the dictates of any judgment but his own, whatever might be the difference of sentiment entertained by the court.

A motion was made by the Attorney General of the United States (Bradford) for a rule to show cause why a mandamus should not be directed to John Lawrence, Judge of the District of New York, in order to compel him to issue a warrant, for apprehending Captain Barre, commander of the frigate Le Perdrix, belonging to the French Republic.

== See also ==
- List of United States Supreme Court cases, volume 3
