= Hollingsworth v. Virginia =

- Supreme Court of the United States

Decided February 14, 1798
- Full case name: Levi Hollingsworth, et al. v. Virginia
- Citations: 3 U.S. 378 (more) 3 Dall. 378; 1 L. Ed. 644; 1798 U.S. LEXIS 145

Holding
- The President has no formal role in the ratification of Constitutional Amendments. The Eleventh Amendment governs cases both past and future.

Court membership
- Chief Justice Oliver Ellsworth Associate Justices James Wilson · William Cushing; James Iredell · William Paterson; Samuel Chase

Case opinion
- Per curiam

Laws applied
- U.S. Const. art. V, U.S. Const. amend. XI

Hollingsworth v. Virginia, 3 U.S. (3 Dall.) 378 (1798), was a United States Supreme Court case in which the court held that that the President of the United States had no formal role in the process of amending the United States Constitution and that the Eleventh Amendment was binding on cases already pending prior to its ratification.

== Background ==
Levi Hollingsworth was a Pennsylvania merchant who owned shares in the Indiana Company, which was heavily involved in land speculation seeking to resolve a land claim with the state of Virginia regarding land in what is now West Virginia. He replaced a previous plaintiff in the case, a Virginian named William Grayson, when the Supreme Court decided in Chisholm v. Georgia (1793) that a state could be sued in federal court by a citizen of another state, as Hollingsworth was from another state, whereas Grayson was not. This derivative suit dragged on, and President John Adams announced on January 8, 1798 that the Eleventh Amendment, which superseded Chisholm, had been ratified.

The first main issue in the case was whether the amendment was valid despite that it had not been presented to the president for approval or veto. The second was whether it applied retroactively to ongoing cases that had already begun before it was ratified.

The attorneys for Hollingsworth were William Tilghman and William Rawle. They argued for presidential involvement in the amendment process and against the constitutionality of the amendment, saying: "Upon an inspection of the original roll, it appears that the amendment was never submitted to the President for his approbation." The proposed amendment had been laid before President George Washington merely "for transmission" to the states.

United States Attorney General Charles Lee took the position during oral argument that the amendment had been properly proposed.

== Opinion of the Court ==
The court decided by a unanimous per curiam decision that the Eleventh Amendment had been validly adopted. The court also decided that it had no jurisdiction in the case, even though it had arisen prior to the amendment's ratification. The court's entire opinion read as follows:

The Court, on the day succeeding the argument, delivered an unanimous opinion, that the amendment being constitutionally adopted, there could not be exercised any jurisdiction, in any case, past or future, in which a state was sued by the citizens of another state, or by citizens, or subjects, of any foreign state.

In oral argument, Justice Samuel Chase stated that the president had nothing to do with proposition or adoption of amendments:

Lee, Attorney General.... Two objections are made: 1st, That the amendment has not been proposed in due form. But has not the same course been pursued relative to all the other amendments, that have been adopted? And the case of amendments is evidently a substantive act, unconnected with the ordinary business of legislation, and not within the policy, or terms, of investing the President with a qualified negative on the acts and resolutions of Congress. 2nd, That the amendment itself only applies to future suits.

Chase, Justice. There can, surely, be no necessity to answer that argument. The negative of the President applies only to the ordinary cases of legislation: He has nothing to do with the proposition, or adoption, of amendments to the Constitution.

The brief report by the reporter of decisions quoted Chase and the arguments of the opposing attorneys, but did not give precise reasons for the court's unanimous decision.

=== Interpretation ===
Article Five of the United States Constitution says: "The Congress, whenever two thirds of both Houses shall deem it necessary, shall propose Amendments to this Constitution". Congress thus may propose an amendment with a two-thirds vote of both houses of Congress, according to the decision in Hollingsworth without waiting for a constitutional convention or a presidential signature or anything else. The clarity of this language in Article Five has been cited as a reason why the court did not think that further explanation of its decision was needed.

Although the Presentment Clause generally gives the president veto power, the interpretive principle that the specific governs the general (generalia specialibus non derogant) is generally considered applicable to the specific circumstance of a constitutional amendment. Article Five requires Congress to propose amendments "whenever" it deems necessary by the same supermajority specified in the more general Presentment Clause, so Congress has always treated the latter vote as unnecessary and inapplicable.

== Later developments and legacy ==
Hollingsworth is generally considered sufficiently entrenched in the law that even scholars who disagree with the court's holding concede that it is exceptionally unlikely to be overturned.

The question of whether the president can veto a proposed amendment was also answered negatively in Immigration and Naturalization Service v. Chadha (1983), albeit in dicta:

An exception from the Presentment Clauses was ratified in Hollingsworth v. Virginia, 3 Dall. 378 (1798). There the Court held Presidential approval was unnecessary for a proposed constitutional amendment which had passed both Houses of Congress by the requisite two-thirds majority. See U.S. Const., Art. V…. We also note that the Court's holding in Hollingsworth, supra, that a resolution proposing an amendment to the Constitution need not be presented to the President, is subject to two alternative protections. First, a constitutional amendment must command the votes of two-thirds of each House. Second, three-fourths of the states must ratify any amendment.

=== Possible early instance of judicial review ===
Hollingsworth was one of the earliest instances of judicial review by the Supreme Court, as the court decided whether the Eleventh Amendment would be upheld. It also may mark the first time that the court struck down a federal law as unconstitutional, assuming that it was reading the amendment retroactively to invalidate part of the Judiciary Act of 1789.

There was an even earlier case, U.S. v. Todd (1794), that also may have held an act of Congress unconstitutional. However, in 1800, Justice Samuel Chase implied that neither Hollingsworth nor Todd involved any unconstitutional federal statute:

It is indeed a general opinion—it is expressly admitted by all this bar and some of the judges have, individually in the circuits decided, that the Supreme Court can declare an act of Congress to be unconstitutional, and therefore invalid, but there is no adjudication of the Supreme Court itself upon the point.

Assuming that Chase was correct, Marbury v. Madison would have been the first such case. Indeed, legal scholar Walter Dellinger argued that that the first judicial review of a constitutional amendment (in Hollingsworth) predated the first judicial review of federal legislation (in Marbury).

=== Alternative theories ===
In 1996, historian David E. Kyvig argued that the Supreme Court in Hollingsworth adopted the position put forward by Attorney General Charles Lee, though he did not explain which of Lee's specific arguments he believed were adopted by the court or how the language in its opinion explained the primary issues of the respective scopes of Article Five and of Article One, Section 7, Clause 3 and the interplay (if any) between the two provisions.

In 2005, attorney Seth B. Tillman wrote an article in the Texas Law Review theorizing that it could be incorrect to interpret Hollingsworth as holding that constitutional amendment resolutions need not be presented to the president for possible veto, notwithstanding that the court had since adopted that interpretation of Hollingsworth in Hawke v. Smith (1920) and INS v. Chadha (1983). He did not argue that Hollingsworth was wrongly decided, but only that its originally-understood scope might have been narrower than commonly thought today.

Tillman argued that because Justice Chase's statement to Attorney General Charles Lee at oral argument was not his official opinion, the failure of the other justices to contradict him should not elevate the status of the remark to an official opinion by either him or by the court. Moreover, Tillman argued that there were several other grounds potentially explaining the court's decision, including that the proposed Eleventh Amendment was in fact delivered to President Washington for signature and that his non-signature did not amount to a pocket veto because Congress remained in session. If this latter explanation were correct, then the court would have only decided that on the particular facts that the Eleventh Amendment was valid rather than on the general requirement or lack thereof for a president to sign the proposed amendment.

Other explanations for the Hollingsworth holding are also possible. For example, Tillman also noted Chase's specific language at oral argument, where he took the position that the president played no role in regard to the "proposition ... or adoption" of amendments. However, the court's actual opinion only used the "adoption" language and did not mention "proposition" as Chase had. This could imply that the court believed that once three quarters of the states had ratified a proposed amendment (i.e., how the amendment was "adopted"), then it was part of the Constitution regardless of potential defects in how the amendment was proposed.

During oral argument in Hollingsworth, Lee advanced two independent arguments in support of the validity of the Eleventh Amendment. He argued first that it was valid because presentment to the president was not necessary, and second that the amendment was in "due form" because it was enacted using the same procedures which were used in enacting the Bill of Rights. He did not advance the alternative theory that the amendment was valid because Washington had declined to veto it. If the court adopted the alternative position in Hollingsworth as suggested by Tillman, then the court would have silently based its decision on particular facts rather than on the general legal requirement or lack thereof for a president to sign the proposed amendment, an argument which was not presented to it by the parties. The parties did, however, have an opportunity to speak to Lee's "due form" argument, which is consistent with the text of the court's opinion, at oral argument, so the court could still have addressed it even if the parties neglected it.

== See also ==
- List of United States Supreme Court cases, volume 3
