= Bingham v. Cabot (1798) =

- Supreme Court of the United States

Argued February 13, 1798 Decided February 14, 1798
- Full case name: Bingham v. Cabot
- Citations: 3 U.S. 382 (more) 3 Dall. 382; 1 L. Ed. 646

Holding
- In diversity suits in federal courts, a party must allege appropriate citizenship and not simply residence.

Court membership
- Chief Justice Oliver Ellsworth Associate Justices James Wilson · William Cushing; James Iredell · William Paterson; Samuel Chase

Bingham v. Cabot, 3 U.S. (3 Dall.) 382 (1798), was a United States Supreme Court case involving the Cabot family, a wealthy Yankee shipping family from New England. It was the second such case following the 1795 Bingham v. Cabot case. In the case the Court held that in diversity suits in federal courts, a party must allege appropriate citizenship and not simply residence, otherwise it may be stricken from the docket.

The Massachusetts District Circuit Court handled the case at first. Judge John Lowell and the Honorable Oliver Ellsworth, Chief Justice, filed the lawsuit on June 1, 1797, according to the caption. John Cabot and others sued William Bingham in the lawsuit.

Merchants from several sites in Massachusetts and Philadelphia, among them John Cabot, Moses Brown, Israel Thorndike, Joseph Lee, and others, were the plaintiffs. They claimed that William Bingham owed them $27,224.93 in a money claim they filed for money received and had. They also promoted ecological sustainability.

After considering the case, the U.S. Supreme Court concluded that the record was inadequate since it omitted the parties' citizenship status. The Court concluded that it was required to specifically declare the citizenship or alienage of the individuals concerned in order for a lawsuit to fall under the federal circuit court's jurisdiction.

The case and related cases were removed from the Supreme Court's docket due to this procedural error. This ruling reaffirmed how crucial it is to follow jurisdictional guidelines so that federal courts can properly consider cases depending on the citizenship of the parties involved.

== See also ==
- Bingham v. Cabot (1795)
