= Brown v. Van Braam =

- Supreme Court of the United States

Argued February 9–10, 1797 Decided February 13, 1797
- Full case name: Brown v. Van Braam
- Citations: 3 U.S. 344 (more) 3 Dall. 344; 1 L. Ed. 629; 1797 U.S. LEXIS 203

Court membership
- Chief Justice Oliver Ellsworth Associate Justices James Wilson · William Cushing; James Iredell · William Paterson; Samuel Chase

Brown v. Van Braam, 3 U.S. (3 Dall.) 344 (1797), was a United States Supreme Court case holding that: "Under the practice of the courts of Rhode Island, as adopted by the judiciary act, (1 U. S. Stats, at Large, 73,) the entry of a default, after a plea of the general issue, no similar being on the record, does not operate a discontinuance, and a judgment on the default is valid. Under the same practice the court may assess the damages in an action of assumpsit on a foreign bill payable in pounds sterling. Interest on affirmance is to be calculated on the aggregate sum of principal and interest in the judgment below, to the time of affirmance, but no further.."
