= United States v. La Vengeance =

- Supreme Court of the United States

Argued August 10, 1796 Decided August 11, 1796
- Full case name: United States v. La Vengeance
- Citations: 3 U.S. 297 (more) 3 Dall. 297; 1 L. Ed. 610; 1796 U.S. LEXIS 402

Case history
- Prior: Error from the Circuit Court for the District of New York

Holding
- A proceeding by the United States to forfeit a vessel is a cause of admiralty and maritime jurisdiction, and courts will take judicial notice of a geographical fact.

Court membership
- Chief Justice Oliver Ellsworth Associate Justices James Wilson · William Cushing; James Iredell · William Paterson; Samuel Chase

Case opinion
- Majority: Ellsworth, joined by unanimous

United States v. La Vengeance, 3 U.S. (3 Dall.) 297 (1796), was a 1796 decision of the United States Supreme Court which found that a proceeding by the United States to forfeit a vessel is a cause of admiralty and maritime jurisdiction. Specifically, "[a]n injunction to enforce the forfeiture of a vessel, for an illegal exportation of arms and ammunition, is a civil cause of admiralty and maritime jurisdiction. The courts will take judicial notice of a geographical fact."
