= United States v. Schooner Sally =

- Supreme Court of the United States

Decided February 22, 1805
- Full case name: United States v. Schooner Sally of Norfolk
- Citations: 6 U.S. 406 (more) 2 Cranch 406

Holding
- the question of forfeiture of a vessel is of admiralty and maritime jurisdiction, not of common law

Court membership
- Chief Justice John Marshall Associate Justices William Cushing · William Paterson; Samuel Chase · Bushrod Washington; William Johnson

Case opinion
- Majority: No opinion

Laws applied
- United States v. La Vengeance (1796)

United States v. Schooner Sally, 6 U.S. (2 Cranch) 406 (1805), was an 1805 decision of the United States Supreme Court which found that the question of forfeiture of a vessel is of admiralty and maritime jurisdiction, not of common law.

== Background information ==
The schooner Sally and her cargo were seized by the collector of the port of Nottingham, under the authority of an act of Congress "To prohibit the carrying on the Slave Trade from the United States to any foreign place or country" (3 Cong. Ch. 11, March 22, 1794, 1 Stat. 347). Libel (i.e., a suit in admiralty) brought by claimant, Elias De Butts, in the United States District Court for the District of Maryland.

== Procedural history ==
1. District Court acquitted both vessel and cargo on the merits.
2. Circuit Court affirmed decree on appeal.
3. The United States sued out to the Supreme Court on a writ of error.

== Issues ==
1. Whether the cause was of common law jurisdiction, or of admiralty and maritime jurisdiction.

== Holding ==
The question of forfeiture of a vessel under 1 Stat. 347 is not of common law, but of admiralty and maritime jurisdiction.

In United States v. La Vengeance (3 Dall. 297), the Court held that a proceeding by the United States to forfeit a vessel is a cause of admiralty and maritime jurisdiction. Therefore, per the authority of that decision, no argument was heard on the case and was decided without issuing an opinion.
