= Penhallow v. Doane's Administrators =

- Supreme Court of the United States

Argued February 6, 9–14, 16, 1795 Decided February 24, 1795
- Full case name: Penhallow, et al. v. Doane's Administrators
- Citations: 3 U.S. 54 (more) 3 Dall. 54; 1 L. Ed. 507; 1795 U.S. LEXIS 329; 1999 AMC 2652

Holding
- Federal district courts have the powers in prize causes that were formerly granted to the Court of Appeals in Cases of Capture under the Congress of the Articles of Confederation.

Court membership
- Chief Justice John Jay Associate Justices James Wilson · William Cushing; John Blair Jr. · James Iredell; William Paterson

Case opinion
- Majority: Paterson, joined by unanimous

Penhallow v. Doane's Administrators, 3 U.S. (3 Dall.) 54 (1795), was a United States Supreme Court case about prize causes. It held that federal district courts have the powers that had been granted to the Court of Appeals in Cases of Capture under the Congress of the Articles of Confederation:

it was held that the Congress under the Confederation had power to erect a court of appeals in prize causes, that its decrees were conclusive, and that the district courts of the United States created under the Constitution have, as courts of admiralty, power to carry into effect the decrees of the former court of appeals in prize causes erected by the Congress of the Confederation.
