= Calder v. Bull =

- Supreme Court of the United States

Argued February 8, 1798 Decided August 8, 1798
- Full case name: Calder et Wife v. Bull et Wife
- Citations: 3 U.S. 386 (more) 3 Dall. 386; 1 L. Ed. 648; 1798 U.S. LEXIS 148

Case history
- Prior: In error from the State of Connecticut

Holding
- The Ex Post Facto Clause applies to criminal, not civil, cases.

Court membership
- Chief Justice Oliver Ellsworth Associate Justices James Wilson · William Cushing; James Iredell · William Paterson; Samuel Chase

Case opinions
- Seriatim: Chase
- Seriatim: Paterson
- Seriatim: Iredell
- Seriatim: Cushing
- Ellsworth took no part in the consideration or decision of the case.

Laws applied
- U.S. Const. art. I, § 10, cl. 1

Calder v. Bull, 3 U.S. (3 Dall.) 386 (1798), is a United States Supreme Court case in which the Court decided four important points of constitutional law.

First, the ex post facto clause of the United States Constitution applies to criminal laws that have at least one of four effects:

1st. Every law that makes an action done before the passing of the law, and which was innocent when done, criminal; and punishes such action. 2nd. Every law that aggravates a crime, makes it greater than it was, when committed. 3rd. Every law that changes the punishment, and inflicts a greater punishment, than the law annexed to the crime, when committed. 4th. Every law that alters the legal rules of evidence, and receives less, or different, testimony, than the law required at the time of the commission of the offence, in order to convict the offender.

The decision restates this categorization later as laws "that create, or aggregate, the crime; or encrease [sic] the punishment, or change the rules of evidence, for the purpose of conviction" [emphasis in the original].

Second, the Supreme Court lacked the authority to nullify state laws that violate that state's constitution:

this court has no jurisdiction to determine that any law of any state Legislature, contrary to the Constitution of such state is void.

Third, the Supreme Court said that:

no man should be compelled to do what the laws do not require; nor to refrain from acts which the laws permit. [emphasis in the original]

Fourth, the Supreme Court decided that this specific act of the Connecticut legislature, and any other state legislative act, is not a violation of the ex post facto clause if

there is no fact done by Bull and wife, Plaintiffs in Error, that is in any manner affected by the law or resolution of Connecticut: It does not concern, or relate to, any act done by them. [emphasis in the original]

== Background ==
The Connecticut General Assembly ordered a new trial in a court case about the contents of a will, overruling an earlier court ruling. In a unanimous decision, the United States Supreme Court held that the legislature's actions did not violate the ex post facto law in article 1, section 10 of the Constitution, which states:

No State shall enter into any Treaty, Alliance, or Confederation; grant Letters of Marque and Reprisal; coin Money; emit Bills of Credit; make any Thing but gold and silver Coin a Tender in Payment of Debts; pass any Bill of Attainder, ex post facto Law, or Law impairing the Obligation of Contracts, or grant any Title of Nobility.

An ex post facto law or retroactive law, is a law that retroactively changes the legal consequences of acts committed or the legal status of facts and relationships that existed prior to the enactment of the law.

The holding in this case still remains good law: the ex post facto provision of the Constitution applies solely to criminal cases, not civil cases.

== Legal arguments ==
In this case, the participating Supreme Court judges were William Cushing, James Iredell, William Paterson and Samuel Chase.

Justice Samuel Chase argued that the government has no authority to interfere with an individual's rights, and "the general principles of law and reason" forbid the legislature from interfering. He then explained that judges ought to rely on natural law when making their decisions:

The purposes for which men enter into society will determine the nature and terms of their social compact.... There are certain vital principles in our free republican governments which will determine and overrule an apparent and flagrant abuse of legislative power; as to authorize manifest injustice by positive law; or to take away that security for personal liberty, or private property, for the protection whereof government was established. An act of the Legislature (for I cannot call it a law) contrary to the great first principles of the social compact, cannot be considered a rightful exercise of legislative authority.... It seems to me, that the right of property, in its origin, could only arise from compact express, or implied, and I think it the better opinion, that the right, as well as the mode, or manner, of acquiring property, and of alienating or transferring, inheriting, or transmitting it, is conferred by society...and is always subject to the rules prescribed by positive law.

Justice James Iredell stated that courts cannot strike down statutes based only upon principles of natural justice:

[t]he ideas of natural justice are regulated by no fixed standard: the ablest and the purest men have differed upon the subject; and all that the Court could properly say, in such an event, would be, that the Legislature (possessed of an equal right of opinion) had passed an act which, in the opinion of the judges, was inconsistent with the abstract principles of natural justice.

Iredell affirmed the ability of the Supreme Court to review legislative acts, but based on something more than principles of natural justice:

If any act of Congress, or of the Legislature of a state, violates those constitutional provisions, it is unquestionably void...If, on the other hand, the Legislature of the Union, or the Legislature of any member of the Union, shall pass a law, within the general scope of their constitutional power, the Court cannot pronounce it to be void, merely because it is, in their judgment, contrary to the principles of natural justice... There are then but two lights, in which the subject can be viewed: 1st. If the Legislature pursue the authority delegated to them, their acts are valid...they exercise the discretion vested in them by the people, to whom alone they are responsible for the faithful discharge of their trust... 2nd. If they transgress the boundaries of that authority, their acts are invalid...they violate a fundamental law, which must be our guide, whenever we are called upon as judges to determine the validity of a legislative act.

And:

If, then, a government, composed of Legislative, Executive and Judicial departments, were established, by a Constitution, which imposed no limits on the legislative power, the consequence would inevitably be, that whatever the legislative power chose to enact, would be lawfully enacted, and the judicial power could never interpose to pronounce it void. It is true, that some speculative jurists have held, that a legislative act against natural justice must, in itself, be void; but I cannot think that, under such a government, any Court of Justice would possess a power to declare it so.

Justice William Cushing agreed with the judgement, saying that:

The case appears to me to be clear of all difficulty, taken either way. If the act is a judicial act, it is not touched by the Federal Constitution: and, if it is a legislative act, it is maintained and justified by the ancient and uniform practice of the state of Connecticut.

This case explains that an ex post facto law is the legislature exercising a judicial power.

These acts were legislative judgments; and an exercise of judicial power.

This case explained the grounds that individuals who brought forth such law used as a justification:

The ground for the exercise of such legislative power was this, that the safety of the kingdom depended on the death, or other punishment, of the offender: as if traitors, when discovered, could be so formidable, or the government so insecure! With very few exceptions, the advocates of such laws were stimulated by ambition, or personal resentment, and vindictive malice. To prevent such, and similar, acts of violence and injustice, I believe, the Federal and State Legislatures, were prohibited from passing any bill of attainder; or any ex post facto law.

Chase explained the difference between ex post facto laws (which are prohibited) and retrospective laws (which are allowed):

In my opinion, the true distinction is between ex post facto laws, and retrospective laws. Every ex post facto law must necessarily be retrospective; but every retrospective law is not an ex post facto law: The former, only, are prohibited. Every law that takes away, or impairs, rights vested, agreeably to existing laws, is retrospective, and is generally unjust, and may be oppressive; and it is a good general rule, that a law should have no retrospect: but there are cases in which laws may justly, and for the benefit of the community, and also of individuals, relate to a time antecedent to their commencement; as statutes of oblivion, or of pardon. [emphasis in the original]

Although this case is good law, courts do not decide if a law violates the Ex Post Facto Clause based on its benefit to the person it is enacted upon. Nor are challenges made to some retrospective law based on a separation of powers dispute.

== See also ==
- List of United States Supreme Court cases, volume 3
- Rule according to higher law
- Martin v. Hunter's Lessee and Cohens v. Virginia, two subsequent cases that involved the court's ability to review state law.
