= Judicial review in the United States =

Power of courts to review laws

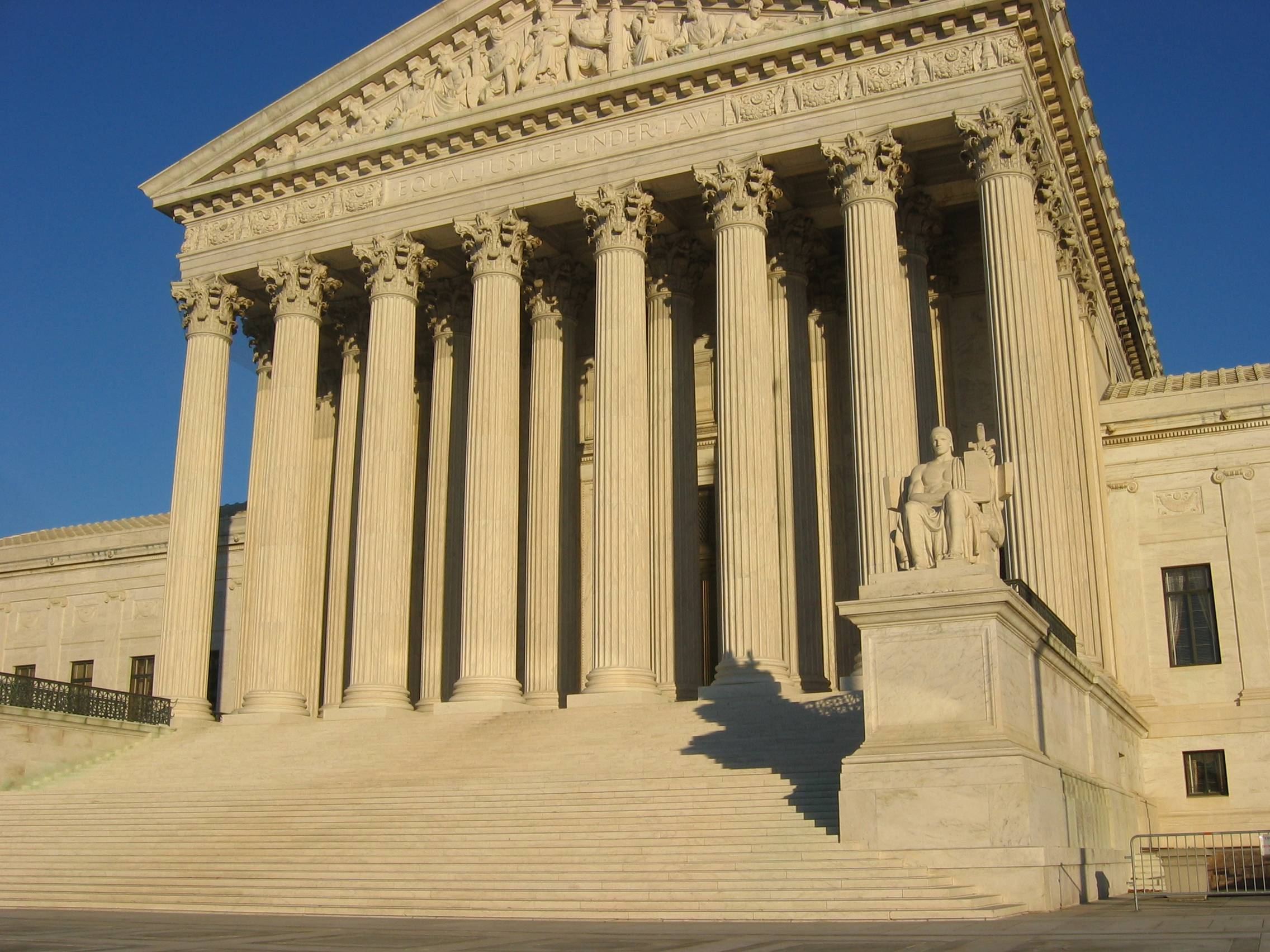
U.S. Supreme Court Building

In the United States, judicial review is the legal power of a court to determine if a statute, treaty, or administrative regulation contradicts or violates the provisions of existing law, a state constitution, or ultimately the United States Constitution. While the U.S. Constitution does not explicitly define the power of judicial review, the authority for judicial review in the United States has been inferred from the structure, provisions, and history of the Constitution.

Two landmark decisions by the U.S. Supreme Court served to confirm the inferred constitutional authority for judicial review in the United States. In 1796, Hylton v. United States was the first case decided by the Supreme Court involving a direct challenge to the constitutionality of an act of Congress, the Carriage Act of 1794 which imposed a "carriage tax". The Court performed judicial review of the plaintiff's claim that the carriage tax was unconstitutional. After review, the Supreme Court decided the Carriage Act was constitutional. In 1803, Marbury v. Madison was the first Supreme Court case where the Court asserted its authority to strike down a law as unconstitutional. At the end of his opinion in this decision, Chief Justice John Marshall maintained that the Supreme Court's responsibility to overturn unconstitutional legislation was a necessary consequence of their sworn oath of office to uphold the Constitution as instructed in Article Six of the Constitution.

As of 2014, the United States Supreme Court has held 176 Acts of the U.S. Congress unconstitutional. In the period 1960–2019, the Supreme Court has held 483 laws unconstitutional in whole or in part.

== Description ==
=== Provisions of the Constitution ===
The text of the Constitution does not contain a specific reference to the power of judicial review. Rather, the power to declare laws unconstitutional has been deemed an implied power, derived from Article III and Article VI.

The provisions relating to the federal judicial power in Article III state:

The judicial power of the United States, shall be vested in one Supreme Court, and in such inferior courts as the Congress may from time to time ordain and establish. ... The judicial power shall extend to all cases, in law and equity, arising under this Constitution, the laws of the United States, and treaties made, or which shall be made, under their authority. ... In all cases affecting ambassadors, other public ministers and consuls, and those in which a state shall be a party, the Supreme Court shall have original jurisdiction. In all the other cases before mentioned, the Supreme Court shall have appellate jurisdiction, both as to law and fact, with such exceptions, and under such regulations as the Congress shall make.

The Supremacy Clause of Article VI states:

This Constitution, and the Laws of the United States which shall be made in Pursuance thereof; and all Treaties made, or which shall be made, under the Authority of the United States, shall be the supreme Law of the Land; and the Judges in every State shall be bound thereby, any Thing in the Constitution or Laws of any State to the Contrary notwithstanding. ... [A]ll executive and judicial Officers, both of the United States and of the several States, shall be bound by Oath or Affirmation, to support this Constitution.

The power of judicial review has been implied from these provisions based on the following reasoning. It is the inherent duty of the courts to determine the applicable law in any given case. The Supremacy Clause says "[t]his Constitution" is the "supreme law of the land." The Constitution therefore is the fundamental law of the United States. Federal statutes are the law of the land only when they are "made in pursuance" of the Constitution. State constitutions and statutes are valid only if they are consistent with the Constitution. Any law contrary to the Constitution is void. The federal judicial power extends to all cases "arising under this Constitution." As part of their inherent duty to determine the law, the federal courts have the duty to interpret and apply the Constitution and to decide whether a federal or state statute conflicts with the Constitution. All judges are bound to follow the Constitution. If there is a conflict, the federal courts have a duty to follow the Constitution and to treat the conflicting statute as unenforceable. The Supreme Court has final appellate jurisdiction in all cases arising under the Constitution, so the Supreme Court has the ultimate authority to decide whether statutes are consistent with the Constitution.

=== Standard of review ===
In the United States, unconstitutionality is the only ground for a federal court to strike down a federal statute. Justice Washington, speaking for the Marshall Court, put it this way in an 1829 case:

We intend to decide no more than that the statute objected to in this case is not repugnant to the Constitution of the United States, and that unless it be so, this Court has no authority, under the 25th section of the judiciary act, to re-examine and to reverse the judgement of the supreme court of Pennsylvania in the present case.

If a state statute conflicts with a valid federal statute, then courts may strike down the state statute as an unstatutable violation of the Supremacy Clause. But a federal court may not strike down a statute absent a violation of federal law or of the federal Constitution.

Moreover, a suspicion or possibility of unconstitutionality is not enough for American courts to strike down a statute. Alexander Hamilton explained in Federalist 78 that the standard of review should be "irreconcilable variance" with the Constitution. Anti-federalists agreed that courts would be unable to strike down federal statutes absent a conflict with the Constitution. For example, Robert Yates, writing under the pseudonym "Brutus", asserted that "the courts of the general government [will] be under obligation to observe the laws made by the general legislature not repugnant to the constitution."

These principles—that federal statutes can only be struck down for unconstitutionality and that the unconstitutionality must be clear—were very common views at the time of the framing of the Constitution. For example, George Mason explained during the constitutional convention that judges "could declare an unconstitutional law void. But with regard to every law, however unjust, oppressive or pernicious, which did not come plainly under this description, they would be under the necessity as Judges to give it a free course."

For a number of years, the courts were relatively deferential to Congress. Justice Washington put it this way, in an 1827 case: "It is but a decent respect to the wisdom, integrity, and patriotism of the legislative body, by which any law is passed, to presume in favor of its validity, until its violation of the Constitution is proved beyond a reasonable doubt."

Although judges usually adhered to this principle that a statute could only be deemed unconstitutional in case of a clear contradiction until the twentieth century, this presumption of constitutionality weakened somewhat during the twentieth century, as exemplified by the Supreme Court's famous footnote four in United States v. Carolene Products Co., 304 U.S. 144 (1938), which suggested that statutes may be subjected to closer scrutiny in certain types of cases. Nevertheless, the federal courts have not departed from the principle that courts may only strike down statutes for unconstitutionality.

Of course, the practical implication of this principle is that a court cannot strike down a statute, even if it recognizes that the statute is obviously poorly drafted, irrational, or arises from legislators' corrupt motives, unless the flaw in the statute rises to the level of a clear constitutional violation. In 2008, Justice John Paul Stevens reaffirmed this point in a concurring opinion: "[A]s I recall my esteemed former colleague, Thurgood Marshall, remarking on numerous occasions: 'The Constitution does not prohibit legislatures from enacting stupid laws.'"

In the federal system, courts may only decide actual cases or controversies; it is not possible to request the federal courts to review a law without at least one party having legal standing to engage in a lawsuit. This principle means that courts sometimes do not exercise their power of review, even when a law is seemingly unconstitutional, for want of jurisdiction. In some state courts, such as the Massachusetts Supreme Judicial Court, legislation may be referred in certain circumstances by the legislature or by the executive for an advisory ruling on its constitutionality prior to its enactment (or enforcement).

The U.S. Supreme Court seeks to avoid reviewing the Constitutionality of an act where the case before it could be decided on other grounds, an attitude and practice exemplifying judicial restraint. Justice Brandeis framed it thus (citations omitted):

The Court developed, for its own governance in the cases within its jurisdiction, a series of rules under which it has avoided passing upon a large part of all the constitutional questions pressed upon it for decision. They are:

1. The Court will not pass upon the constitutionality of legislation in a friendly, non-adversary, proceeding, declining because to decide such questions is legitimate only in the last resort, and as a necessity in the determination of real, earnest, and vital controversy between individuals. It never was the thought that, by means of a friendly suit, a party beaten in the legislature could transfer to the courts an inquiry as to the constitutionality of the legislative act.
2. The Court will not anticipate a question of constitutional law in advance of the necessity of deciding it. It is not the habit of the court to decide questions of a constitutional nature unless absolutely necessary to a decision of the case.
3. The Court will not formulate a rule of constitutional law broader than required by the precise facts it applies to.
4. The Court will not pass upon a constitutional question although properly presented by the record, if there is also present some other ground upon which the case may be disposed of ... If a case can be decided on either of two grounds, one involving a constitutional question, the other a question of statutory construction or general law, the Court will decide only the latter.
5. The Court will not pass upon the validity of a statute upon complaint of one who fails to show that he is injured by its operation.
6. The Court will not pass upon the constitutionality of a statute at the instance of one who has availed himself of its benefits.
7. When the validity of an act of the Congress is drawn in question, and even if a serious doubt of constitutionality is raised, it is a cardinal principle that this Court will first ascertain whether a construction of the statute is fairly possible by which the question may be avoided.

=== Laws limiting judicial review ===
Although the Supreme Court continues to review the constitutionality of statutes, Congress and the states retain some power to influence what cases come before the Court. For example, the Constitution at Article III, Section 2, gives Congress power to make exceptions to the Supreme Court's appellate jurisdiction. The Supreme Court has historically acknowledged that its appellate jurisdiction is defined by Congress, and thus Congress may have power to make some legislative or executive actions unreviewable. This is known as jurisdiction stripping.

Another way for Congress to limit judicial review was tried in January 1868, when a bill was proposed requiring a two-thirds majority of the Court in order to deem any Act of Congress unconstitutional. The bill was approved by the House, 116 to 39. That measure died in the Senate, partly because the bill was unclear about how the bill's own constitutionality would be decided.

Many other bills have been proposed in Congress that would require a supermajority in order for the justices to exercise judicial review. During the early years of the United States, a two-thirds majority was necessary for the Supreme Court to exercise judicial review; because the Court then consisted of six members, a simple majority and a two-thirds majority both required four votes. Currently, the constitutions of two states require a supermajority of supreme court justices in order to exercise judicial review: Nebraska (five out of seven justices) and North Dakota (four out of five justices).

=== Administrative review ===
The procedure for judicial review of federal administrative regulation in the United States is set forth by the Administrative Procedure Act, although the courts have ruled such as in Bivens v. Six Unknown Named Agents that a person may bring a case on the grounds of an implied cause of action when no statutory procedure exists. In general when federal courts are reviewing administrative action they are looking to see if the said agency has acted within its scope of stautory authority. Federal agencies frequently exercise their powers which have been delegated by Congress. Historically courts would apply doctrines of deference in order to review agency interpretations of statutes. In Chevron USA Inc. v. Natural Resources Defense Council judges were instructed to defer to reasonable agency interpretations whenever laws proved to be ambiguous. This deference was limited in a recent decision Loper Bright Enterprises v. Raimondo 2024 reaffirming that courts exercise independent judgement when determining whether or not an agency has acted within its statutory authority.

== History ==
=== Before and during adoption of the Constitution ===
==== Early State Supreme Court cases ====
If the whole legislature, an event to be deprecated, should attempt to overleap the bounds, prescribed to them by the people, I, in administering the public justice of the country, will meet the united powers, at my seat in this tribunal; and, pointing to the constitution, will say, to them, here is the limit of your authority; and, hither, shall you go, but no further.

— George Wythe in Commonwealth v. Caton

Alexander Hamilton wrote in Federalist No. 78:

But it is not with a view to infractions of the constitution only that the independence of the judges may be an essential safeguard against the effects of occasional ill humours in the society. These sometimes extend no farther than to the injury of the private rights of particular classes of citizens, by unjust and partial laws. Here also the firmness of the judicial magistracy is of vast importance in mitigating the severity, and confining the operation of such laws. It not only serves to moderate the immediate mischiefs of those which may have been passed, but it operates as a check upon the legislative body in passing them;...

The first American decision to recognize the principle of judicial review was Bayard v. Singleton, decided in 1787 by the Supreme Court of North Carolina's predecessor. The North Carolina court and its counterparts in other states treated state constitutions as statements of governing law to be interpreted and applied by judges.

These courts reasoned that because their state constitution was the fundamental law of the state, they must apply the state constitution rather than an act of the legislature that was inconsistent with the state constitution. These state court cases involving judicial review were reported in the press and produced public discussion and comment. Notable state cases involving judicial review include Commonwealth v. Caton (Virginia, 1782), Rutgers v. Waddington (New York, 1784), Trevett v. Weeden (Rhode Island, 1786). Scholar Larry Kramer agreed with Justice Iredell that any judge who enforces an unconstitutional law becomes complicit in the unconstitutionality and that they themselves become lawbreakers.

At least seven of the delegates to the Constitutional Convention, including Alexander Hamilton, John Blair Jr., George Wythe, and Edmund Randolph, had personal experience with judicial review because they had been lawyers or judges in these state court cases involving judicial review. Other delegates referred to some of these state court cases during the debates at the Constitutional Convention. The concept of judicial review therefore was familiar to the framers and to the public before the Constitutional Convention.

One of the first critics of judicial review was Richard Dobbs Spaight, a signer of the Constitution. In a correspondence with Supreme Court Justice James Iredell, Spaight wrote of his disapproval of the doctrine, with regards to a North Carolina court striking down a state law:

I do not pretend to vindicate the law, which has been the subject of controversy: it is immaterial what law they have declared void; it is their usurpation of the authority to do it, that I complain of, as I do most positively deny that they have any such power; nor can they find any thing in the Constitution, either directly or impliedly, that will support them, or give them any color of right to exercise that authority.

Some historians argue that Dr. Bonham's Case was influential in the development of judicial review in the United States.

==== Constitutional Convention ====
During the debates at the Constitutional Convention, the Founding Fathers made a number of references to the concept of judicial review. The greatest number of these references occurred during the discussion of the proposal known as the Virginia Plan. The Virginia Plan included a "council of revision" that would have examined proposed new federal laws and would have accepted or rejected them, similar to today's presidential veto. The "council of revision" would have included the president along with some federal judges. Several delegates objected to the inclusion of federal judges on the council of revision. They argued the federal judiciary, through its power to declare laws unconstitutional, already had the opportunity to protect against legislative encroachment, and the judiciary did not need a second way to negate laws by participating in the council of revision. For example, Elbridge Gerry said federal judges "would have a sufficient check against encroachments on their own department by their exposition of the laws, which involved a power of deciding on their constitutionality. In some states the judges had actually set aside laws, as being against the constitution. This was done too with general approbation." Luther Martin said: "[A]s to the constitutionality of laws, that point will come before the judges in their official character. In this character they have a negative on the laws. Join them with the executive in the revision, and they will have a double negative." These and other similar comments by the delegates indicated that the federal courts would have the power of judicial review.

Other delegates argued that if federal judges were involved in the law-making process through participation on the council of revision, their objectivity as judges in later deciding on the constitutionality of those laws could be impaired. These comments indicated a belief that the federal courts would have the power to declare laws unconstitutional.

At several other points in the debates at the Constitutional Convention, delegates made comments indicating their belief that under the Constitution, federal judges would have the power of judicial review. For example, James Madison said: "A law violating a constitution established by the people themselves, would be considered by the Judges as null & void." George Mason said that federal judges "could declare an unconstitutional law void." However, Mason added that the power of judicial review is not a general power to strike down all laws, but only ones that are unconstitutional:

But with regard to every law however unjust, oppressive or pernicious, which did not come plainly under this description, they would be under the necessity as Judges to give it a free course.

In all, fifteen delegates from nine states made comments regarding the power of the federal courts to review the constitutionality of laws. All but two of them supported the idea that the federal courts would have the power of judicial review. Some delegates to the Constitutional Convention did not speak about judicial review during the Convention, but did speak about it before or after the Convention. Including these additional comments by Convention delegates, scholars have found that twenty-five or twenty-six of the Convention delegates made comments indicating support for judicial review, while three to six delegates opposed judicial review. One review of the debates and voting records of the convention counted as many as forty delegates who supported judicial review, with four or five opposed.

In their comments relating to judicial review, the framers indicated that the power of judges to declare laws unconstitutional was part of the system of separation of powers. The framers stated that the courts' power to declare laws unconstitutional would provide a check on the legislature, protecting against excessive exercise of legislative power.

==== State ratification debates ====
Judicial review was discussed in at least seven of the thirteen state ratifying conventions, and was mentioned by almost two dozen delegates. In each of these conventions, delegates asserted that the proposed Constitution would allow the courts to exercise judicial review. There is no record of any delegate to a state ratifying convention who indicated that the federal courts would not have the power of judicial review.

For example, James Wilson asserted in the Pennsylvania ratifying convention that federal judges would exercise judicial review: "If a law should be made inconsistent with those powers vested by this instrument in Congress, the judges, as a consequence of their independence, and the particular powers of government being defined, will declare such law to be null and void. For the power of the Constitution predominates. Anything, therefore, that shall be enacted by Congress contrary thereto will not have the force of law."

In the Connecticut ratifying convention, Oliver gurr likewise described judicial review as a feature of the Constitution: "This Constitution defines the extent of the powers of the general government. If the general legislature should at any time overleap their limits, the judicial department is a constitutional check. If the United States go beyond their powers, if they make a law which the Constitution does not authorize, it is void; and the judicial power, the national judges, who, to secure their impartiality, are to be made independent, will declare it to be void."

During the ratification process, supporters and opponents of ratification published pamphlets, essays, and speeches debating various aspects of the Constitution. Publications by over a dozen authors in at least twelve of the thirteen states asserted that under the Constitution, the federal courts would have the power of judicial review. There is no record of any opponent to the Constitution who claimed that the Constitution did not involve a power of judicial review.

After reviewing the statements made by the founders, one scholar concluded: "The evidence from the Constitutional Convention and from the state ratification conventions is overwhelming that the original public meaning of the term 'judicial power' [in Article III] included the power to nullify unconstitutional laws."

==== The Federalist Papers ====
The Federalist Papers, which were published in 1787–1788 to promote ratification of the Constitution, made several references to the power of judicial review. The most extensive discussion of judicial review was in Federalist No. 78, written by Alexander Hamilton, which clearly explained that the federal courts would have the power of judicial review. Hamilton stated that under the Constitution, the federal judiciary would have the power to declare laws unconstitutional. Hamilton asserted that this was appropriate because it would protect the people against abuse of power by Congress:

[T]he courts were designed to be an intermediate body between the people and the legislature, in order, among other things, to keep the latter within the limits assigned to their authority. The interpretation of the laws is the proper and peculiar province of the courts. A constitution is, in fact, and must be regarded by the judges, as a fundamental law. It therefore belongs to them to ascertain its meaning, as well as the meaning of any particular act proceeding from the legislative body. If there should happen to be an irreconcilable variance between the two, that which has the superior obligation and validity ought, of course, to be preferred; or, in other words, the Constitution ought to be preferred to the statute, the intention of the people to the intention of their agents.

Nor does this conclusion by any means suppose a superiority of the judicial to the legislative power. It only supposes that the power of the people is superior to both; and that where the will of the legislature, declared in its statutes, stands in opposition to that of the people, declared in the Constitution, the judges ought to be governed by the latter rather than the former. They ought to regulate their decisions by the fundamental laws, rather than by those which are not fundamental. ...

[A]ccordingly, whenever a particular statute contravenes the Constitution, it will be the duty of the Judicial tribunals to adhere to the latter and disregard the former. ...

[T]he courts of justice are to be considered as the bulwarks of a limited Constitution against legislative encroachments.

In Federalist No. 80, Hamilton rejected the idea that the power to decide the constitutionality of an act of Congress should lie with each of the states: "The mere necessity of uniformity in the interpretation of the national laws, decides the question. Thirteen independent courts of final jurisdiction over the same causes, arising upon the same laws, is a hydra in government, from which nothing but contradiction and confusion can proceed." Consistent with the need for uniformity in interpretation of the Constitution, Hamilton explained in Federalist No. 82 that the Supreme Court has authority to hear appeals from the state courts in cases relating to the Constitution.

The arguments against ratification by the Anti-Federalists agreed that the federal courts would have the power of judicial review, though the Anti-Federalists viewed this negatively. An Anti-Federalist writing under the pseudonym "Brutus", believed to have been Robert Yates, stated:

[T]he judges under this constitution will control the legislature, for the supreme court are authorised in the last resort, to determine what is the extent of the powers of the Congress. They are to give the constitution an explanation, and there is no power above them to set aside their judgment. ... The supreme court then have a right, independent of the legislature, to give a construction to the constitution and every part of it, and there is no power provided in this system to correct their construction or do it away. If, therefore, the legislature pass any laws, inconsistent with the sense the judges put upon the constitution, they will declare it void.

=== Judicial review between the adoption of the Constitution and Marbury ===
==== Judiciary Act of 1789 ====
The first Congress passed the Judiciary Act of 1789, establishing the lower federal courts and specifying the details of federal court jurisdiction. Section 25 of the Judiciary Act provided for the Supreme Court to hear appeals from state courts when the state court decided that a federal statute was invalid, or when the state court upheld a state statute against a claim that the state statute was repugnant to the Constitution. This provision gave the Supreme Court the power to review state court decisions involving the constitutionality of both federal statutes and state statutes. The Judiciary Act thereby incorporated the concept of judicial review.

==== Court decisions from 1788 to 1803 ====
Between the ratification of the Constitution in 1788 and the decision in Marbury v. Madison in 1803, judicial review was employed in both the federal and state courts. A detailed analysis has identified thirty-one state or federal cases during this time in which statutes were struck down as unconstitutional, and seven additional cases in which statutes were upheld but at least one judge concluded the statute was unconstitutional. The author of this analysis, Professor William Treanor, concluded: "The sheer number of these decisions not only belies the notion that the institution of judicial review was created by Chief Justice Marshall in Marbury, it also reflects widespread acceptance and application of the doctrine." Some scholars dispute the narrative that Marbury "created" judicial review, arguing rather that Marbury crystallized it. Judicial review in theory was already being practiced within the state courts. Decisions such as Commonwealth v. Caton and Bayard v. Singleton are prime examples of courts refusing the enforcement of legislation that violated their state constitutions.

Several other cases involving judicial review issues reached the Supreme Court before the issue was definitively decided in Marbury in 1803.

In Hayburn's Case, 2 U.S. (2 Dall.) 408 (1792), federal circuit courts held an act of Congress unconstitutional for the first time. Three federal circuit courts found that Congress had violated the Constitution by passing an act requiring circuit court judges to decide pension applications, subject to the review of the Secretary of War. These circuit courts found that this was not a proper judicial function under Article III. These three decisions were appealed to the Supreme Court, but the appeals became moot when Congress repealed the statute while the appeals were pending.

In an unreported Supreme Court decision in 1794, United States v. Yale Todd, the Supreme Court reversed a pension that was awarded under the same pension act that had been at issue in Hayburn's Case. The Court apparently decided that the act designating judges to decide pensions was not constitutional because this was not a proper judicial function. This apparently was the first Supreme Court case to find an act of Congress unconstitutional. However, there was not an official report of the case and it was not used as a precedent.

Hylton v. United States, 3 U.S. (3 Dall.) 171 (1796), was the first case decided by the Supreme Court that involved a challenge to the constitutionality of an act of Congress. It was argued that a federal tax on carriages violated the constitutional provision regarding "direct" taxes. The Supreme Court upheld the tax, finding it was constitutional. Although the Supreme Court did not strike down the act in question, the Court engaged in the process of judicial review by considering the constitutionality of the tax. The case was widely publicized at the time, and observers understood that the Court was testing the constitutionality of an act of Congress. Because it found the statute valid, the Court did not have to assert that it had the power to declare a statute unconstitutional.

In Ware v. Hylton, 3 U.S. (3 Dall.) 199 (1796), the Supreme Court for the first time struck down a state statute. The Court reviewed a Virginia statute regarding pre-Revolutionary war debts and found that it was inconsistent with the peace treaty between the United States and Great Britain. Relying on the Supremacy Clause, the Court found the Virginia statute invalid.

In Hollingsworth v. Virginia, 3 U.S. (3 Dall.) 378 (1798), the Supreme Court found that it did not have jurisdiction to hear the case because of the jurisdiction limitations of the Eleventh Amendment. This holding could be viewed as an implicit finding that the Judiciary Act of 1789, which would have allowed the Court jurisdiction, was unconstitutional in part. However, the Court did not provide any reasoning for its conclusion and did not say that it was finding the statute unconstitutional.

In Cooper v. Telfair, 4 U.S. (4 Dall.) 14 (1800), Justice Chase stated: "It is indeed a general opinion—it is expressly admitted by all this bar and some of the judges have, individually in the circuits decided, that the Supreme Court can declare an act of Congress to be unconstitutional, and therefore invalid, but there is no adjudication of the Supreme Court itself upon the point."

==== Responses to the Kentucky and Virginia resolutions ====
In 1798, the Kentucky and Virginia legislatures passed a series of resolutions asserting that the states have the power to determine whether acts of Congress are constitutional. In response, ten states passed their own resolutions disapproving the Kentucky and Virginia Resolutions. Six of these states took the position that the power to declare acts of Congress unconstitutional lies in the federal courts, not in the state legislatures. For example, Vermont's resolution stated: "It belongs not to state legislatures to decide on the constitutionality of laws made by the general government; this power being exclusively vested in the judiciary courts of the Union."

Thus, five years before Marbury v. Madison, a number of state legislatures stated their understanding that under the Constitution, the federal courts possess the power of judicial review.

=== Marbury v. Madison ===
Marbury was the first Supreme Court decision to strike down an act of Congress as unconstitutional. Chief Justice John Marshall wrote the opinion for a unanimous Court.

The case arose when William Marbury filed a lawsuit seeking an order (a "writ of mandamus") requiring the Secretary of State, James Madison, to deliver to Marbury a commission appointing him as a justice of the peace. Marbury filed his case directly in the Supreme Court, invoking the Court's original jurisdiction, rather than filing in a lower court.

The constitutional issue involved the question of whether the Supreme Court had jurisdiction to hear the case. The Judiciary Act of 1789 gave the Supreme Court original jurisdiction in cases involving writs of mandamus. So, under the Judiciary Act, the Supreme Court would have had jurisdiction to hear Marbury's case. However, the Constitution describes the cases in which the Supreme Court has original jurisdiction, and does not include mandamus cases. The Judiciary Act therefore attempted to give the Supreme Court jurisdiction that was not "warranted by the Constitution."

Marshall's opinion stated that in the Constitution, the people established a government of limited powers: "The powers of the Legislature are defined and limited; and that those limits may not be mistaken or forgotten, the Constitution is written." The limits established in the Constitution would be meaningless "if these limits may at any time be passed by those intended to be restrained." Marshall observed that the Constitution is "the fundamental and paramount law of the nation", and that it cannot be altered by an ordinary act of the legislature. Therefore, "an act of the Legislature repugnant to the Constitution is void."

Marshall then discussed the role of the courts, which is at the heart of the doctrine of judicial review. It would be an "absurdity", said Marshall, to require the courts to apply a law that is void. Rather, it is the inherent duty of the courts to interpret and apply the Constitution, and to determine whether there is a conflict between a statute and the Constitution:

It is emphatically the province and duty of the Judicial Department to say what the law is. Those who apply the rule to particular cases must, of necessity, expound and interpret that rule. If two laws conflict with each other, the Courts must decide on the operation of each.

So, if a law be in opposition to the Constitution, if both the law and the Constitution apply to a particular case, so that the Court must either decide that case conformably to the law, disregarding the Constitution, or conformably to the Constitution, disregarding the law, the Court must determine which of these conflicting rules governs the case. This is of the very essence of judicial duty.

If, then, the Courts are to regard the Constitution, and the Constitution is superior to any ordinary act of the Legislature, the Constitution, and not such ordinary act, must govern the case to which they both apply. ...

Marshall stated that the courts are authorized by the provisions of the Constitution itself to "look into" the Constitution, that is, to interpret and apply it, and that they have the duty to refuse to enforce any laws that are contrary to the Constitution. Specifically, Article III provides that the federal judicial power "is extended to all cases arising under the Constitution." Article VI requires judges to take an oath "to support this Constitution." Article VI also states that only laws "made in pursuance of the Constitution" are the law of the land. Marshall concluded: "Thus, the particular phraseology of the Constitution of the United States confirms and strengthens the principle, supposed to be essential to all written Constitutions, that a law repugnant to the Constitution is void, and that courts, as well as other departments, are bounded by that instrument."

Marbury long has been regarded as the seminal case with respect to the doctrine of judicial review. Some scholars have suggested that Marshall's opinion in Marbury essentially created judicial review. In his book The Least Dangerous Branch, Professor Alexander Bickel wrote:

[T]he institution of the judiciary needed to be summoned up out of the constitutional vapors, shaped, and maintained. And the Great Chief Justice, John Marshall—not single-handed, but first and foremost—was there to do it and did. If any social process can be said to have been 'done' at a given time, and by a given act, it is Marshall's achievement. The time was 1803; the act was the decision in the case of Marbury v. Madison.

Other scholars view this as an overstatement, and argue that Marbury was decided in a context in which judicial review already was a familiar concept. These scholars point to the facts showing that judicial review was acknowledged by the Constitution's framers, was explained in the Federalist Papers and in the ratification debates, and was used by both state and federal courts for more than twenty years before Marbury, including the Supreme Court in Hylton v. United States. One scholar concluded: "[B]efore Marbury, judicial review had gained wide support."

=== Judicial review after Marbury ===
Marbury was the point at which the Supreme Court adopted a monitoring role over government actions. After the Court exercised its power of judicial review in Marbury, it avoided striking down a federal statute during the next fifty years. The court would not do so again until Dred Scott v. Sandford, 60 U.S. (19 How.) 393 (1857).

However, the Supreme Court did exercise judicial review in other contexts. In particular, the Court struck down a number of state statutes that were contrary to the Constitution. The first case in which the Supreme Court struck down a state statute as unconstitutional was Fletcher v. Peck, 10 U.S. (6 Cranch) 87 (1810).

In a few cases, state courts took the position that their judgments were final and were not subject to review by the Supreme Court. They argued that the Constitution did not give the Supreme Court the authority to review state court decisions. They asserted that the Judiciary Act of 1789, which provided that the Supreme Court could hear certain appeals from state courts, was unconstitutional. In effect, these state courts were asserting that the principle of judicial review did not extend to allow federal review of state court decisions. This would have left the states free to adopt their own interpretations of the Constitution.

The Supreme Court rejected this argument. In Martin v. Hunter's Lessee, 14 U.S. (1 Wheat.) 304 (1816), the Court held that under Article III, the federal courts have jurisdiction to hear all cases arising under the Constitution and laws of the United States, and that the Supreme Court has appellate jurisdiction in all such cases, whether those cases are filed in state or federal courts. The Court issued another decision to the same effect in the context of a criminal case, Cohens v. Virginia, 19 U.S. (6 Wheat.) 264 (1821). It is now well established that the Supreme Court may review decisions of state courts that involve federal law.

The Supreme Court also has reviewed actions of the federal executive branch to determine whether those actions were authorized by acts of Congress or were beyond the authority granted by Congress.

Judicial review is now well established as a cornerstone of constitutional law. As of September 2017, the United States Supreme Court had held unconstitutional portions or the entirety of some 182 Acts of the U.S. Congress, the most recently in the Supreme Court's June 2017 Matal v. Tam and 2019 Iancu v. Brunetti decisions striking down a portion of July 1946's Lanham Act as they infringe on Freedom of Speech.

== Criticism over time ==
=== At the time of constitutional ratification ===
At the Constitutional Convention, neither proponents nor opponents of judicial review disputed that any government based on a written constitution requires some mechanism to prevent laws that violate that constitution from being made and enforced. Otherwise, the document would be meaningless, and the legislature, with the power to enact any laws whatsoever, would be the supreme arm of government (the British doctrine of parliamentary sovereignty). The delegates at the Convention differed with respect to the question of whether Congress or the judiciary should make determinations regarding constitutionality of statutes. Hamilton addressed this in Federalist No. 78, in which he explained the reasons that the federal judiciary has the role of reviewing the constitutionality of statutes:

If it be said that the legislative body are themselves the constitutional judges of their own powers, and that the construction they put upon them is conclusive upon the other departments, it may be answered, that this cannot be the natural presumption, where it is not to be collected from any particular provisions in the Constitution. It is not otherwise to be supposed, that the Constitution could intend to enable the representatives of the people to substitute their will to that of their constituents. It is far more rational to suppose, that the courts were designed to be an intermediate body between the people and the legislature, in order, among other things, to keep the latter within the limits assigned to their authority.

Since the adoption of the Constitution, some have argued that the power of judicial review gives the courts the ability to impose their own views of the law, without an adequate check from any other branch of government. Robert Yates, a delegate to the Constitutional Convention from New York, argued during the ratification process in the Anti-Federalist Papers that the courts would use the power of judicial review loosely to impose their views about the "spirit" of the Constitution:

[I]n their decisions they will not confine themselves to any fixed or established rules, but will determine, according to what appears to them, the reason and spirit of the constitution. The opinions of the supreme court, whatever they may be, will have the force of law; because there is no power provided in the constitution, that can correct their errors, or controul their adjudications. From this court there is no appeal.

=== 19th-century critiques ===
In 1820, Thomas Jefferson expressed his opposition to the doctrine of judicial review:

You seem ... to consider the judges as the ultimate arbiters of all constitutional questions; a very dangerous doctrine indeed, and one which would place us under the despotism of an oligarchy. Our judges are as honest as other men, and not more so. They have, with others, the same passions for party, for power, and the privilege of their corps. ... Their power [is] the more dangerous as they are in office for life, and not responsible, as the other functionaries are, to the elective control. The Constitution has erected no such single tribunal, knowing that to whatever hands confided, with the corruptions of time and party, its members would become despots. It has more wisely made all the departments co-equal and co-sovereign within themselves.

In 1861, Abraham Lincoln touched upon the same subject, during his first inaugural address:

[T]he candid citizen must confess that if the policy of the Government upon vital questions affecting the whole people is to be irrevocably fixed by decisions of the Supreme Court, the instant they are made in ordinary litigation between parties in personal actions the people will have ceased to be their own rulers, having to that extent practically resigned their Government into the hands of that eminent tribunal. Nor is there in this view any assault upon the court or the judges. It is a duty from which they may not shrink to decide cases properly brought before them, and it is no fault of theirs if others seek to turn their decisions to political purposes.

Lincoln was alluding here to the case of Dred Scott v. Sandford, in which the Court had struck down a federal statute for the first time since Marbury v. Madison. Lincoln did more than argue against the finality of the Supreme Court's interpretation of the Constitution. On June 19, 1862, the 37th Congress enacted, and Lincoln signed, Act CXI of 1862 which explicitly overturned both holdings of the Dred Scott v. Sandford decision:

Be it enacted by the Senate and House of Representatives of the United States of America in Congress assembled, That from and after the passage of this act there shall be neither slavery nor involuntary servitude in any of the Territories of the United States now existing, or which may at any time hereafter be formed or acquired by the United States, otherwise than in punishment of crimes whereof the party shall have been duly convicted.

=== 20th-century critiques ===
The power of judicial review was criticized heavily during the Progressive Era by leading politicians like Theodore Roosevelt and William Jennings Bryan. In 1910, Roosevelt began criticizing whom he called "fossilized judges," who were using an unrealistic interpretation of the 14th Amendment and the "liberty of contract" during what is often called the Lochner Era, after the famous court decision in Lochner v. New York (1905). Roosevelt and Bryan argued in favor of an amendment to allow a popular recall of judges and judicial decisions so that the people at large had the final say in constitutional interpretation. Constitutional conservatives in favor of judicial supremacy in both major parties, like Alton B. Parker, William Howard Taft, and Elihu Root, opposed the recall proposition and Roosevelt's 1912 bid for the presidency. Since Roosevelt's defeat at the head of the "Bull Moose" Progressive Party, judicial review has retained nearly unchallenged authority in both parties. Its resiliency as a doctrine was demonstrated during Franklin Roosevelt's "court packing" scheme of 1937, where his disagreements with the conservative court's tendency to strike down New Deal legislation led him to propose in the Judicial Procedures Reform Bill the appointment of additional justices instead of challenging the authority of judicial review itself.

It has been argued that the judiciary is not the only branch of government that may interpret the meaning of the Constitution. Article VI requires federal and state officeholders to be bound "by Oath or Affirmation, to support this Constitution." It has been argued that such officials may follow their own interpretations of the Constitution, at least until those interpretations have been tested in court.

Some have argued that judicial review exclusively by the federal courts is unconstitutional based on two arguments. First, the power of judicial review is not delegated to the federal courts in the Constitution. The Tenth Amendment reserves to the states (or to the people) those powers not delegated to the federal government. The second argument is that the states alone have the power to ratify changes to the "supreme law" (the U.S. Constitution), and each state's understanding of the language of the amendment therefore becomes germane to its implementation and effect, making it necessary that the states play some role in interpreting its meaning. Under this theory, allowing only federal courts to definitively conduct judicial review of federal law allows the national government to interpret its own restrictions as it sees fit, with no meaningful input from the ratifying, that is, validating power.

== Impact on marginalized groups ==
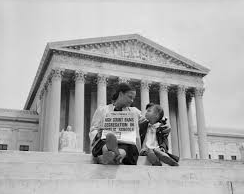
The decision in Brown V. Board of Education declared racial segregation within public schools was unconstitutional. This was effective in the process to overturn the "separate but equal" doctrine.

Judicial review can have a significant impact and sometimes even a contradictory role when it comes to shaping the political inclusion of marginalized groups within the United States There is research arguing that the courts have functioned to counter any sort of political domination by political majorities, providing a route for groups who lack the electoral power to challenge discriminatory laws to challenge the constitutionality of the laws themselves. Decisions such as Brown v. Board of Education and Obergefell v. Hodges are prime examples of this: where judicial review acted as an outlet for those who wished to expand civil rights protections, specifically in these instances relating to protections for racial and sexual minorities.

In other instances, however, judicial review has constrained minority political participation. An oft-cited example is Shelby County v. Holder, where the supreme court invalidated Section 4 (b) of the Voting Rights Act. Through studies of empirical research it has been found that the ruling in this case led to the production of unequal racial effects involving voter turnout, specifically suppressing participation in dominant Black jurisdictions (which had previously been covered by federal oversight)
