= Penhallow (disambiguation) =

Penhallow may mean:

== Places ==
- Penhallow, a hamlet in Cornwall, England

== People ==
- Andrew Penhallow, founder of Volition Records
- Arthur Penhallow, radio presenter
- David P. Penhallow, botanist
- Samuel Penhallow, colonist and historian

== Other uses ==
- Penhallow Hotel fire, 2007
- Penhallow v. Doane's Administrators, US Supreme Court case, 1795
