= Lindsey v. Miller =

- Supreme Court of the United States
- Full case name: Lindsey v. Miller
- Citations: 3 U.S. 411 (more) 3 Dall. 411; 1 L. Ed. 657

Lindsey v. Miller, 3 U.S. (3 Dall.) 411 (1799), was a United States Supreme Court case in which the Court held that: "The fact that the land demanded in a suit was granted by and is claimed under a State, does not make the State a party to the suit, within the meaning of the second section of the third article of the constitution. Nor does an issue upon the point whether the land demanded is within the limits of the State.

A certiorari does not issue to remove a cause, on account of want of jurisdiction in the court in which it is pending."

== Background ==
The state of Virginia issued patents (deeds) for land north of the Ohio River. After the deeds were issued, Virginia ceded that territory to the federal government, which subsequently organized the area as the Northwest Territory and later as State of Ohio. The case revolved around Virginia's standing to protect those deeds.
