= Sims' Lessee v. Irvine =

Sims Leffe v. Irvine
- Supreme Court of the United States
- Full case name: Sims's Lessee v. Irvine
- Citations: 3 U.S. 425 (more) 3 Dall. 425; 1 L. Ed. 665

Sims's Lessee v. Irvine, 3 U.S. (3 Dall.) 425 (1799), is an early United States Supreme Court case about conflicting land claims. General William Irvine had been granted Montour's Island by Pennsylvania for his service in the American Revolutionary War, but the island was also claimed by Charles Simms of Virginia. The Court unanimously found in favor of Simms, who had the earlier claim.

The Court held that: "A military right to unappropriated land in America, acquired under a royal proclamation of 1763, was made assignable by the law of Virginia, to an inhabitant of that State.

Obtaining a warrant and so locating it as to describe a particular parcel of land, gave to the assignee a complete equitable title, which was confirmed by the compact between Pennsylvania and Virginia.

A survey in Pennsylvania, and payment of the consideration, gave a legal right of entry, which supports an ejectment. This right remains legal, though it may have originally been held so from a defect of equitable powers, and though the courts of the United States now possess those powers."

== See also ==
- List of United States Supreme Court cases, volume 3
