= 1794 Massachusetts gubernatorial election =

- April 7, 1794
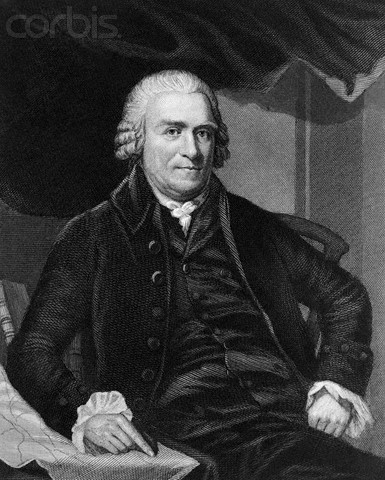

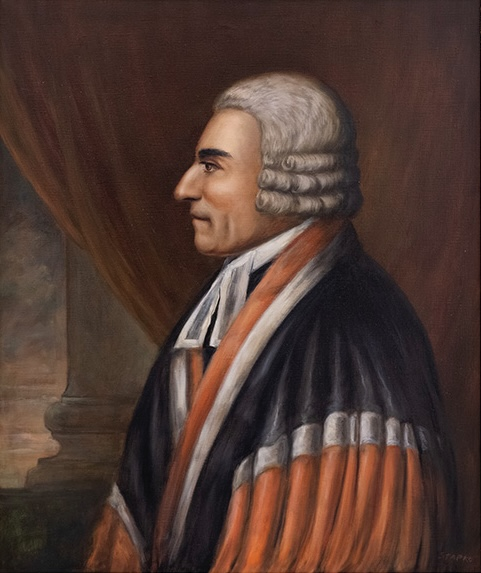
| Nominee | Samuel Adams | William Cushing |
| Party | Democratic-Republican | Federalist |
| Popular vote | 14,465 | 7,159 |
| Percentage | 61.67% | 30.52% |
- County results Adams: 40–50% 50–60% 70–80% 80–90% Cushing: 50-60%
Governor before election
Samuel Adams (acting)
Democratic-Republican
Elected Governor
Samuel Adams
Democratic-Republican

The 1794 Massachusetts gubernatorial election was held on April 7.

Incumbent Governor John Hancock, who had occupied the office for all but two years since its establishment in 1780, died in office on October 8, 1793. Lieutenant Governor Samuel Adams succeeded Hancock as acting Governor and was elected to a full term in office over William Cushing. The campaign between Adams and Cushing began to transition Massachusetts from a non-partisan system dominated by political personalities to a two-party system divided between Federalists and Republicans.

== General election ==
=== Candidates ===
- Samuel Adams, incumbent Governor since 1794 (Republican)
- William Cushing, Associate Justice of the United States Supreme Court (Federalist)

=== Results ===
1794 Massachusetts gubernatorial election
| Party | Candidate | Votes | % | ±% |
|---|---|---|---|---|
| Democratic-Republican | Samuel Adams (incumbent) | 14,465 | 61.67% | |
| Federalist | William Cushing | 7,159 | 30.52% | |
| Others | Scattering | 1,830 | 7.81% | |
| Total votes | | 23,454 | 100.00% | |
| Democratic-Republican gain from Nonpartisan | | Swing | | |
