= Seriatim =

Legal and actuarial term

Seriatim (Latin for "in series") in law indicates that a court is addressing multiple issues in a certain order, such as the order in which the issues were originally presented to the court. In actuarial science it refers to a model that looks at each data point separately.

== Legal usage ==
A seriatim opinion is an opinion delivered by a court with multiple judges, in which each judge reads his or her own opinion rather than a single judge writing an opinion on behalf of the entire court. Traditionally, judges read in order of reverse seniority, with the most junior judge speaking first. In the United States, this practice was discontinued in favour of majority opinions contra the British tradition of separate opinions.

=== In England and Wales ===
Nowadays, the word is most frequently used (when used at all) as a shorthand for "one by one in sequence". For example, in English civil cases, defence statements generally used to conclude with the phrase "save as expressly admitted herein, each allegation of the plaintiffs is denied as if set out in full and traversed herein seriatim." This formulation is now superfluous under the English Civil Procedure Rules, especially rule 16.5 (3)–(5).

The word is sometimes seen in older deeds and contracts as a more traditional way of incorporating terms of reference. For example "the railway by-laws shall apply to the contract as if set out herein seriatim."

It is sometimes found as part of the longer phrase breviatim et seriatim, meaning "briefly and in series".

The term is also used when replying to a communication that contains a number of points, issues or questions to denote that the responses are in the same order in which they were raised in the original document: "To deal with your queries seriatim..."

In England, use of the word, and other Latin phrases, has become less frequent in legal discourse as a result of the Woolf reforms and, among other factors, efforts by groups such as the Plain Language Movement to promote the use of "plain English" in legal discourse.

=== In the United States ===
During the Marshall Court of the early 19th century, the United States Supreme Court discontinued issuing opinions seriatim, instead delivering one unanimous opinion, or majority, concurring, and dissenting opinions, a practice that continues today. When there is a unanimous or a majority opinion, it becomes the opinion of the court.

Outside of the Supreme Court's practice, the word is still occasionally used in the 21st century. For instance, the 2009, Title III, Rule 15(a)(1) of the U.S. Federal Rules of Civil Procedure regarding Amended and Supplemental Pleadings (part of pretrial procedure) was amended to allow three changes in the time previously allowed to make one change. The change was described as follows:

This provision will force the pleader to consider carefully and promptly the wisdom of amending to meet the arguments in the motion ... and will expedite determination of issues that otherwise might be raised seriatim.

The right to make changes now ends 21 days after service of a motion.

== Actuarial usage ==
Actuarial calculations made in respect of a database (such as insurance policies or asset holdings) may be referred to as seriatim. This implies calculation results are produced for each database record (for example, a single insurance policy) without model compression (data grouping) and before summation.
