= James Iredell =

US Supreme Court justice from 1790 to 1799

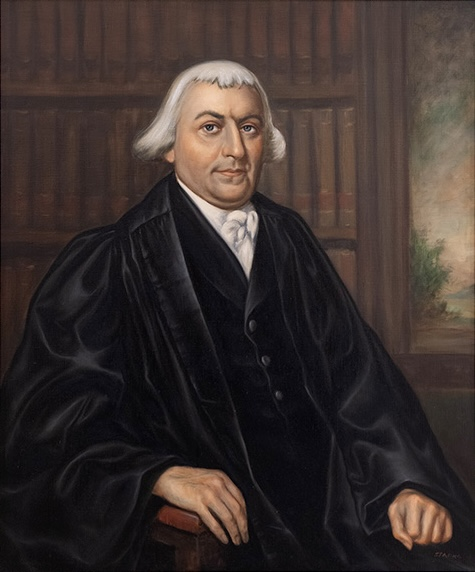

Associate Justice of the Supreme Court of the United States
- In office May 12, 1790 – October 20, 1799
- Nominated by: George Washington
- Preceded by: Seat established
- Succeeded by: Alfred Moore

3rd Attorney General of North Carolina
- In office July 8, 1779 – April 22, 1782
- Governor: Richard Caswell; Abner Nash; Thomas Burke
- Preceded by: Waightstill Avery
- Succeeded by: Alfred Moore

Personal details
- Born: October 5, 1751 Lewes, England, Great Britain
- Died: October 20, 1799 (aged 48) Edenton, North Carolina, U.S.
- Party: Federalist

James Iredell (October 5, 1751 – October 20, 1799) was one of the first justices of the Supreme Court of the United States. He was appointed by President George Washington and served from 1790 until his death in 1799. His son, James Iredell Jr., was a governor of North Carolina.

== Early life ==
Coat of Arms of James Iredell

James Iredell was born in Lewes, England, the oldest of five surviving children of Francis Iredell, a Bristol merchant and his wife, the former Margaret McCulloch, of Dublin, Ireland. The failure of his father's business (and health) impelled James to emigrate to the Colonies in 1767 at the age of 17. Relatives assisted him in obtaining a position in the customs service as deputy collector, or comptroller, of the port of Edenton, North Carolina.

While working at the customs house, Iredell read law under Samuel Johnston (later governor of North Carolina), began the practice of law and was admitted to the bar in 1771. The grandson of a clergyman, he was a devout Anglican throughout his life and his writings display an interest in spirituality and metaphysics beyond a simple attachment to organized religion.

In 1773, Iredell married Johnston's sister Hannah and the two had four children after twelve childless years. In 1774 he was made collector for the port.

== Roles in the Revolution ==
Although employed by the British government, Iredell was a strong supporter of independence and the revolution. In 1774, he wrote To the Inhabitants of Great Britain where he laid out arguments opposing the concept of parliamentary supremacy over America. This essay established Iredell, then 23, as the most influential political essayist in North Carolina at that time. His treatise Principles of an American Whig predates and echoes themes and ideas of the Declaration of Independence.

After the revolution began, Iredell helped organize the court system of North Carolina, and was elected a judge of the superior court in 1778. His career advanced through a number of political and judicial posts in the state, including that of attorney general from 1779 to 1781. In 1787 the state assembly appointed him commissioner and charged him with compiling and revising the laws of North Carolina. His work was published in 1791 as Iredell's Revisal.

Following the Revolution, financial limitations barred his being a delegate to the Philadelphia convention, he corresponded regularly with the North Carolina delegates. Iredell was a leader of the Federalists in North Carolina, and a strong supporter of the proposed Constitution. In the 1788 convention at Hillsborough, he argued unsuccessfully in favor of its adoption. Iredell was the floor leader for the Federalists (North Carolina later ratified the Constitution after Congress amended it through the addition of the Bill of Rights). After the convention failed to ratify the Constitution, he continued to promote it, joining William R. Davie (the later founder of the University of North Carolina), to publish the convention debates at their own expense for distribution across the state.

== Supreme Court Justice ==
On February 8, 1790, President George Washington nominated Iredell as an associate justice on the newly established United States Supreme Court, and on February 10, he was confirmed by the United States Senate. He was sworn into office on May 12.

The case load of the first Supreme Court was light. In fact, the court did not hear its first case until 1791 when it decided West v. Barnes. The decision was unanimous, but Iredell requested that Congress change the harsh statute governing the West decision as explained in his seriatim decision. The Justices gathered to hear arguments only twice a year, and there are only a handful of opinions written by Justice Iredell in his years on the court. Of them, two of the most significant are:

- Chisholm v. Georgia (1793): At issue was whether the citizens of one state (South Carolina) could sue another state (Georgia) for repayment of Revolutionary War bills. Iredell was the lone dissent from the majority opinion that held that a state may be sued in federal court without its consent to the suit.
- Calder v. Bull (1798): At issue was whether an act of the Connecticut legislature violated the Constitution because it was an ex post facto law, forbidden pursuant to Article I, Section 9, Clause 3.

In the Chisholm case, public and political opinion agreed with Iredell against the other Justices. The outcry and strong reaction of people against the Chisholm decision would lead to its reversal by the adoption of the Eleventh Amendment in 1795.

In the unanimous decision in Calder, the Court held that the Clause applied to criminal cases only, deciding that the legislature's act was not unconstitutional. More importantly, Calder raised the question of whether "principles of natural justice" constituted law. Iredell's opinion indicated that only those actions of a state that explicitly violated a textual provision of the Constitution could be declared void. He stated, "The principles of natural justice are regulated by no fixed standard; the ablest and the purest men have differed upon the subject; and all the court could properly say, in such an event, would be, that the legislature (possessed of an equal right of opinion) had passed an act which, in the opinion of the judges, was inconsistent with the abstract principles of natural justice." Scholars have pointed to Iredell's essay To The Public as one of the clearest and best reasoned defenses of judicial review.

Justice Iredell's opinion in Calder helped establish the principle of judicial review five years before it was tested in Marbury v. Madison (1803). The Supreme Court has followed Iredell's approach throughout its subsequent history.

Iredell's charge to the federal grand jury in Fries' Case is commonly cited as evidence that the framers' intent was to limit the scope of the First Amendment to freedom from prior restraint. He praised Sir William Blackstone's narrow interpretation of freedom of the press, noted that the framers were very familiar with Blackstone's work, and observed that "unless his explanation had been satisfactory, I presume the amendment would have been more particularly worded, to guard against any possible mistake."

=== Circuit riding ===
An important part of Iredell's duties on the Supreme Court was circuit riding. Under the Judiciary Act of 1789, Congress created three geographical circuits—the Eastern, Middle, and Southern—and required Supreme Court justices to travel to the federal circuit courts within their assigned regions. The circuit courts were the principal trial courts of the federal judiciary and initially had no judges of their own; each was staffed by the local federal district judge and two Supreme Court justices.

Circuit riding placed substantial demands on the justices, particularly during the early years of the federal judiciary. Roads were often poor or nonexistent, bridges were scarce, and travelers sometimes had to ford rivers or rely on ferries. Travel was generally by horseback or horse-drawn carriage and offered little protection from severe weather. Accommodations along the routes were also limited; inns frequently offered little privacy or comfort, and travelers sometimes had to share rooms or beds with strangers. Iredell experienced such conditions himself, on one occasion sharing a room with five other people and a bed with another traveler.

Iredell was the last of the original six Supreme Court justices to be appointed and was therefore not present when the initial circuit assignments were made. He was assigned to the Southern Circuit, which covered the largest territory and was considered the most difficult of the three to traverse. While riding the Southern Circuit with Justice John Rutledge in 1790, Iredell traveled approximately 1,900 miles (3,100 km). He remarked upon the sparsely settled and barren terrain he encountered during the journey.

After Iredell was again assigned to the Southern Circuit in 1791, he objected to John Jay, then the chief justice, and proposed that circuit assignments rotate among the justices. In addition to the extensive travel required, Iredell noted that his circuit duties interfered with his legal affairs in North Carolina. His fellow justices did not adopt his proposal, although Justice William Cushing sympathized with his complaints and suggested that he exchange assignments with Justice John Blair. Iredell subsequently appealed to Congress for a rotation system. In 1792, Congress enacted a provision preventing a justice, without his consent, from being reassigned to the same circuit until each of the other justices had served there. The rotation requirement remained in effect until the Judiciary Act of 1801 reorganized the federal circuit system.

The hazards of circuit travel also affected Iredell personally. In 1792, while traveling in a horse-drawn gig, his horse attempted to run off. The carriage struck a tree, throwing Iredell to the ground, after which one of its wheels ran over his leg and severely injured him. He was also robbed on a later circuit journey.

Iredell's complaints were part of broader dissatisfaction with circuit riding among the early justices. In August 1792, the members of the Supreme Court jointly appealed to President George Washington, arguing that the extensive travel required of them was excessively burdensome and particularly difficult for justices whose health or physical condition made long journeys hazardous. They noted that their duties required them to hold circuit courts throughout the states in addition to attending two annual sessions of the Supreme Court. Congress responded in 1793 by reducing from two to one the number of Supreme Court justices required to attend each circuit court session.

== Later years and death ==
Iredell's health deteriorated during the final years of his judicial service. Illness prevented him from attending the Supreme Court's February 1794 session. In August of that year, he declined to substitute for Justice James Wilson on the Southern Circuit, noting that he had already been required to cover the circuit five times during the preceding four years. Despite the reduction in the number of justices required to attend each circuit court, illness and the need for substitutions meant that the reform did not always reduce the individual justices' travel as intended.

Iredell continued to serve on the Supreme Court until his death in Edenton, North Carolina, on October 20, 1799, at the age of 48.

== Slavery ==
Iredell mirrored contemporaries like Thomas Jefferson and George Washington in openly condemning slavery while participating in the practice itself. Iredell owned 14 slaves in 1786, and he and his wife Hannah both owned slaves at the time of their deaths.

As a lawyer, Iredell assisted in both abolitionist and pro-slavery cases. In 1777, Iredell and his friend William Hooper provided legal assistance to more than 40 former slaves emancipated by the Quakers in northeastern North Carolina after the 1777 North Carolina General Assembly ordered the former slaves' seizure and resale. In 1769, Iredell assisted his father, Thomas, in selling a runaway slave and requested herring and red-oak staves as part of the proceeds. In 1789, Iredell was listed as the contact for the sale of an enslaved man named Jack, who had belonged to the late Mrs. Nash.

=== Opinions on the Slave Trade Clause ===
Iredell addressed Virginian delegate George Mason's objection to Article One, Section 9, Clause 1 of the US Constitution ("Slave Trade Clause") on grounds of practicality. Iredell believed that the Constitution would not be ratified by South Carolina nor Georgia without the inclusion of the Slave Trade Clause, writing, "Our situation...makes it necessary to bear the evil as it is."

While Iredell believed "the interests of humanity" would be advanced through abolition, that slave trade existed too long "for the honor and humanity of those concerned in it," and that its abolition would be "pleasing to every generous mind, and every friend of human nature," he nonetheless believed the ratification of the Constitution would provide a pathway for abolition in the long-term, and that, unless they were beholden to the Constitution, states such as South Carolina and Georgia would never pursue the path of abolition. Therefore, "'though at a distant period,' the provisions for the abolition of the slave trade would 'set an example of humanity.'"

In the time between ratification of the Constitution and abolition, Iredell wrote, "judgement upon slavery in the United States must rest between the individuals' consciences and God."

=== Slavery in his personal life ===
Iredell owned slaves throughout his life. In 1786, Iredell reported owning 14 slaves. Though some surviving records of Iredell's slaves are partly illegible, names of slaves Iredell owned during his lifetime include Peter, Sarah (Peter's wife), Edy, Dundee, and Hannibal. Iredell's brother, Arthur, intended to bequeath slaves he inherited from their father, Thomas, to James after their father's death. However, the transaction fell through, and James transferred the title for the slaves to Arthur. During his lifetime, James Iredell freed some of his slaves, including Peter, Edy, and Dundee, and visited them in subsequent years in Philadelphia. Scholars consider Iredell a "humane master", based upon surviving writings. However, James Iredell and his wife Hannah both owned slaves at the time of their deaths.

==== Peter ====
In his biography of James Iredell, judicial historian Willis Whichard notes Iredell's close relationship with one of his slaves, Peter. Peter regularly traveled with Iredell before gaining his freedom, and was subsequently hired by Iredell. After Peter gained his freedom, Iredell praised a hired servant, David, by comparing him to Peter's performance.

In 1793, when the Iredell family moved from Philadelphia to Edenton, North Carolina, Iredell freed Peter along with 2 other slaves, Edy and Dundee. Peter became a woodcutter after gaining his freedom. He was regularly hired by Iredell when Iredell returned to visit Philadelphia and, on one occasion, check on Hannah Iredell's nephew, James Johnston.

== Legacy ==
Iredell County, North Carolina, was established in 1788 and was named for Iredell.

SS James Iredell, a ship in World War II, was named after him.

The James Iredell House at Edenton was listed on the National Register of Historic Places in 1970.

== In popular culture ==
James Iredell is featured as a character in A More Obedient Wife: A Novel of the Early Supreme Court, a historical novel by Natalie Wexler focused on his wife, Hannah, and her friend Hannah Wilson.

== See also ==
- List of justices of the Supreme Court of the United States

== Sources ==
Legal offices
Preceded by Waightstill Avery	Attorney General of North Carolina; 1779–1782	Succeeded by Alfred Moore
New seat	Associate Justice of the Supreme Court of the United States; 1790–1799	Succeeded by Alfred Moore
