= William Cushing =

American lawyer (1732–1810)

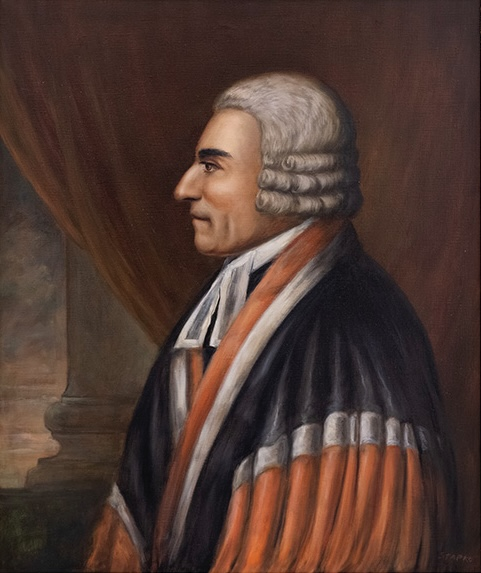

Associate Justice of the Supreme Court of the United States
- In office February 2, 1790 – September 13, 1810
- Nominated by: George Washington
- Preceded by: Seat established
- Succeeded by: Joseph Story

Chief Justice of the Massachusetts Supreme Judicial Court
- In office 1777–1789
- Preceded by: Peter Oliver; John Adams (appointed, but never sat)
- Succeeded by: Nathaniel Peaslee Sargent

Associate Justice of the Massachusetts Superior Court of Judicature
- In office 1772–1777
- Preceded by: Peter Oliver
- Succeeded by: David Sewall

Personal details
- Born: March 1, 1732 Scituate, Massachusetts Bay
- Died: September 13, 1810 (aged 78) Scituate, Massachusetts, U.S.
- Education: Harvard College (BA)

William Cushing (March 1, 1732 – September 13, 1810) was an American lawyer who was one of the original five associate justices of the United States Supreme Court; confirmed by the United States Senate on September 26, 1789, he served until his death. His Supreme Court tenure of 20 years and 11 months was the longest among the Court's inaugural members. In January 1796, he was nominated by President George Washington to become the Court's Chief Justice; though confirmed, he declined the appointment. He was the last judge in the United States to wear a full wig as part of his court dress.

== Early life and education ==
Cushing was born in Scituate, Massachusetts Bay, on March 1, 1732. The Cushing family had a long history in the area, settling Hingham in 1638. Cushing's father, John Cushing (1695–1778), was a provincial magistrate who in 1747 became an associate justice of the Superior Court of Judicature, the province's high court. William Cushing's grandfather John Cushing (1662–1737/38) was also a superior court judge and member of the governor's council.

Cushing's mother, Mary Cotton Cushing, was a daughter of Josiah Cotton (1679/80–1756). They were descended from Rev. John Cotton, the great 17th century Puritan theologian. Josiah Cotton and Richard Fitzgerald, a teacher at a local Latin school, were responsible for young Cushing's early education.

Cushing graduated from Harvard College in 1751 and became a member of the bar of Boston in 1755. After briefly practicing law in Scituate, he moved to Pownalborough (present-day Dresden, Maine, then part of Massachusetts), and became the first practicing attorney in the province's eastern district (as Maine was then known). In 1762 he was called to become a barrister, again the first in Maine. He practiced law until 1772, when he was appointed by Governor Thomas Hutchinson to replace his father (who had resigned) on the Superior Court bench.

== Career ==
Not long after his tenure on the Massachusetts bench began, a controversy arose over revelations that court judges were to be paid by crown funds from London rather than by an appropriation of the provincial assembly. Cushing did not express any opinion on the matter, but declined the crown payment in preference to a provincial appropriation.

After the American Revolutionary War broke out in April 1775, the Massachusetts Provincial Congress (which exercised de facto control over the province outside besieged Boston), sought to reorganize the courts to remove the trappings of British sovereignty. Consequently, it essentially dissolved the Superior Court and reformed it in November 1775. Of all its justices, Cushing was the only one retained.

The congress offered the seat of Chief Justice first to John Adams, but he never sat, and resigned the post in 1776. The provincial congress appointed Cushing to be the court's first sitting Chief Justice in 1777. He was a charter member of the American Academy of Arts and Sciences (1780). He would sit as Massachusetts Chief Justice until 1789, during which period the court ruled in 1783 that slavery was irreconcilable with the new state constitution, and it was ended in the state.

=== Massachusetts chief justice ===
In 1783, Cushing presided over a series of cases involving Quock Walker, a slave who filed a freedom suit based on the language of the new state constitution. In Commonwealth v. Jennison, Cushing stated the following principles, in his charge to the jury:

As to the doctrine of slavery and the right of Christians to hold Africans in perpetual servitude, and sell and treat them as we do our horses and cattle, that (it is true) has been heretofore countenanced by the Province Laws formerly, but nowhere is it expressly enacted or established. It has been a usage – a usage which took its origin from the practice of some of the European nations, and the regulations of British government respecting the then Colonies, for the benefit of trade and wealth. But whatever sentiments have formerly prevailed in this particular or slid in upon us by the example of others, a different idea has taken place with the people of America, more favorable to the natural rights of mankind, and to that natural, innate desire of Liberty, with which Heaven (without regard to color, complexion, or shape of noses-features) has inspired all the human race. And upon this ground our Constitution of Government, by which the people of this Commonwealth have solemnly bound themselves, sets out with declaring that all men are born free and equal – and that every subject is entitled to liberty, and to have it guarded by the laws, as well as life and property – and in short is totally repugnant to the idea of being born slaves. This being the case, I think the idea of slavery is inconsistent with our own conduct and Constitution; and there can be no such thing as perpetual servitude of a rational creature, unless his liberty is forfeited by some criminal conduct or given up by personal consent or contract ...

This was taken to mean that slavery was incompatible with the state constitution ratified in 1779, and that slavery was therefore ended in the state. The case relied on a 1781 freedom suit brought by slave Elizabeth Freeman, also known as Mum Bett, on the same grounds; a Massachusetts county court ruled in her favor in 1781.

During Shays' Rebellion (1786–87), Cushing ensured that court sessions continued, despite the aggressive protests of the armed rebels, and later presided over their trials. A year later, in 1788, he served as vice president of the Massachusetts convention, which narrowly ratified the United States Constitution.

=== U.S. Supreme Court ===
On September 24, 1789, President George Washington nominated Cushing for one of the five associate justice positions on the newly established Supreme Court. His appointment (along with those of: John Blair Jr.; Robert H. Harrison; John Rutledge; and James Wilson; plus that of John Jay for Chief Justice) was confirmed by the Senate two days later. Cushing's service on the Court officially began February 2, 1790, when he took the Judicial oath. He generally held a nationalist view typically in line with the views of the Federalist Party, and often disagreed with Thomas Jefferson's Democratic-Republicans. His two most important decisions were probably Chisholm v. Georgia and Ware v. Hylton, which held that treaties made under the Constitution supersede state law. Though he served on the Court for two decades, only 19 of his decisions appear in the United States Reports.

Cushing administered the oath of office at Washington's second inauguration on March 4, 1793. This was the first inauguration to take place in Philadelphia (then the nation's capital). While a justice, Cushing ran as the Federalist nominee in the 1794 Massachusetts gubernatorial election, losing in a landslide to incumbent Samuel Adams.

When Chief Justice John Jay resigned from the Court in June 1795, during a long Senate recess, Washington appointed John Rutledge as the new chief justice by a recess appointment. On December 15, 1795, during the Senate's next session, it rejected Rutledge's nomination. Washington subsequently nominated Cushing on January 26, 1796; the Senate confirmed the nomination the following day.

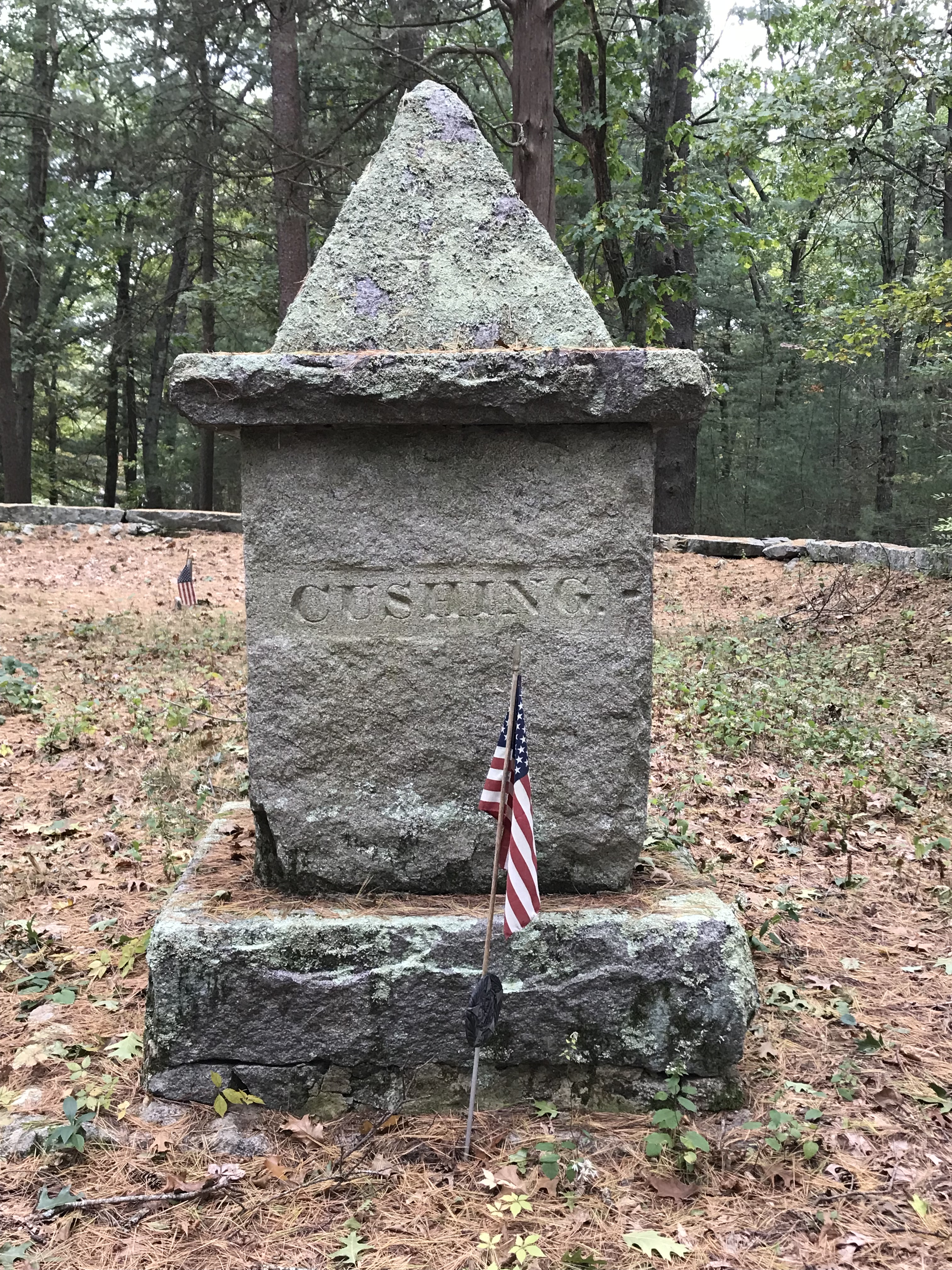
Cushing's gravesite

Cushing received his commission on January 27, but returned it to Washington on February 2, declining appointment. An error in the rough minutes of the Court on February 3 and 4, 1796, lists Cushing as Chief Justice, although this entry was later crossed out. This error can be explained by the text of the Judiciary Act of 1789, which allowed for the Court to hear cases with a quorum of only four justices; that is, the Chief Justice need not always be present for the Court to conduct business. As Cushing was the most senior associate justice present on those dates, he would have been expected to serve as the presiding justice, directing the Court's business.

Washington then nominated Oliver Ellsworth to be chief justice, transmitting the nomination to the Senate in a March 3 message stating that Ellsworth would replace "William Cushing, resigned." Subsequent histories of the Court have not counted Cushing as chief justice, but instead report that he declined the appointment. Had Cushing accepted promotion to chief justice and then resigned, he would have had to leave the Court entirely; accepting the appointment would have implicitly required Cushing to resign his place as associate justice. That he continued on the Court as an associate justice for years afterward lends weight to the assertion that Cushing declined promotion. Additionally, Cushing's February 2 letter explicitly stated his return of the commission for chief justice, and his desire to retain his seat as associate justice.

== Later life and death ==
In 1810, Cushing died in his hometown of Scituate, Massachusetts. He is buried in a small cemetery there which is also a state park.

== See also ==
- Judiciary Act of 1789
- List of nominations to the Supreme Court of the United States
- List of United States Supreme Court cases prior to the Marshall Court
- List of justices of the Supreme Court of the United States

== Bibliography ==
- Abraham, Henry J. (1992). Justices and Presidents: A Political History of Appointments to the Supreme Court (3rd ed.). New York: Oxford University Press. ISBN 0-19-506557-3.
- Cushman, Clare (2001). The Supreme Court Justices: Illustrated Biographies, 1789–1995 (2nd ed.). (Supreme Court Historical Society, Congressional Quarterly Books). ISBN 1-56802-126-7.
- Davies, Ross E.: "William Cushing, Chief Justice of the United States", University of Toledo Law Review, Vol. 37, No. 3, Spring 2006
- Flanders, Henry. The Lives and Times of the Chief Justices of the United States Supreme Court. Philadelphia: J. B. Lippincott & Co., 1874 at Google Books.
- Frank, John P. (1995). Friedman, Leon; Israel, Fred L. (eds.). The Justices of the United States Supreme Court: Their Lives and Major Opinions. Chelsea House Publishers. ISBN 0-7910-1377-4.
- Hall, Kermit L., ed. (1992). The Oxford Companion to the Supreme Court of the United States. New York: Oxford University Press. ISBN 0-19-505835-6.
- Marcus, Maeva; Perry, James R., eds. (1985). The Documentary History of the Supreme Court of the United States, 1789-1800. Vol. 1. New York, NY: Columbia University Press.
- Martin, Fenton S.; Goehlert, Robert U. (1990). The U.S. Supreme Court: A Bibliography. Washington, D.C.: Congressional Quarterly Books. ISBN 0-87187-554-3.
- Mauro, Tony: "The Chief Justice Who Wasn't There", Legal Times (September 19, 2005)
- Rugg, Arthur (December 1920). "William Cushing". The Yale Law Journal. 30 (2): 128–144. doi:10.2307/787099. JSTOR 787099. (Rugg was chief justice of the Massachusetts SJC when he wrote this biographical sketch.)

Party political offices
| First | Federalist nominee for Governor of Massachusetts; 1794, 1795 | Succeeded by Increase Sumner |
Legal offices
| Preceded by Peter Oliver | Associate Justice of the Massachusetts Superior Court of Judicature; 1772–1777 | Succeeded by David Sewall |
| Preceded by Peter Oliver | Chief Justice of the Massachusetts Supreme Judicial Court; 1777–1789 | Succeeded by Nathaniel Peaslee Sargent |
| New seat | Associate Justice of the Supreme Court of the United States; 1790–1810 | Succeeded by Joseph Story |
