= Alexander J. Dallas (statesman) =

American politician (1759–1817)

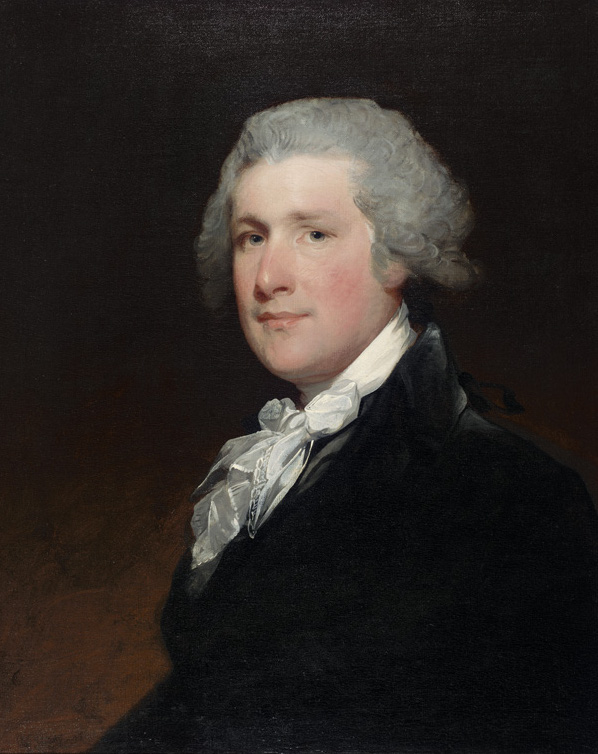
- Portrait by Gilbert Stuart, c. 1800

United States Secretary of War
- Acting
- In office March 2, 1815 – August 1, 1815
- President: James Madison
- Preceded by: James Monroe
- Succeeded by: William H. Crawford

Acting United States Secretary of State
- In office 1815
- President: James Madison

6th United States Secretary of the Treasury
- In office October 6, 1814 – October 21, 1816
- President: James Madison
- Preceded by: George W. Campbell
- Succeeded by: William H. Crawford

United States Attorney for the Eastern District of Pennsylvania
- In office 1801–1814

1st Reporter of Decisions of the United States Supreme Court
- In office 1790–1800
- Preceded by: Position established
- Succeeded by: William Cranch

Personal details
- Born: Alexander James Dallas; June 21, 1759 Kingston, Colony of Jamaica
- Died: January 16, 1817 (aged 57) Philadelphia, Pennsylvania, U.S.
- Party: Democratic-Republican
- Spouse: Arabella Smith (m. 1780)
- Children: George M. Dallas
- Education: University of Edinburgh

Alexander James Dallas (June 21, 1759 – January 16, 1817) was an American statesman who served as the 6th United States Secretary of the Treasury from 1814 to 1816 under President James Madison. He was also a lawyer who worked as the United States Attorney for the Eastern District of Pennsylvania (1801–1814) and the 1st Reporter of Decisions of the United States Supreme Court (1790–1800).

== Early life ==
Dallas was born in Kingston, Jamaica, to Robert Charles Dallas, Sr. and Sarah Elizabeth (Cormack) Hewitt. His brother was Robert Charles Dallas, who wrote a history of the Jamaican Maroons. Dallas bought the Boar Castle estate on the Cane River, Jamaica in 1758, changing its name to Dallas Castle. This property included 900 acres and 91 slaves. Dallas left the island in 1764, having mortgaged the estate and put it in a trust.

When Alexander was five, his family moved to Edinburgh and then to London. There he studied under James Elphinston, a Scottish educator and linguist. He planned to study law, but was unable to afford it. In 1780, Alexander married Arabella Maria Smith (1761–1837) of Pennsylvania. Arabella came from a family lineage with prominent connections to the British military as the daughter of Major George Smith of the British Army and Arabella Barlow, and a great-granddaughter of Sir Nicholas Trevanion, by way of Reverend William Barlow and Arabella Trevanion. In 1781, they moved to Jamaica. There, Alexander was admitted to the bar through his father's connections. However, Maria's health suffered in Jamaica, and they subsequently moved to Philadelphia in 1783, where he was admitted to the Pennsylvania bar in 1785. To supplement his budding law practice, he also took side jobs editing the Pennsylvania Herald from 1787 to 1788 and the Columbian Magazine from 1787 to 1789.

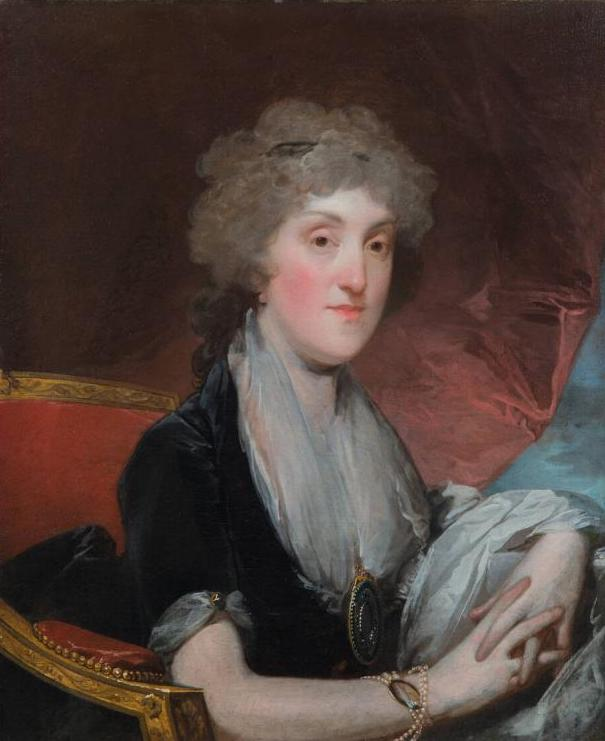
Arabella Maria Smith Dallas

== U.S. Supreme Court Reporter ==
Dallas published the second set of state court reports (Ephraim Kirby was first with Connecticut Reports) entitled Reports of Cases Ruled and Adjudged in the Courts of Pennsylvania Before and Since the Revolution in 1790 containing cases from 1754 to 1789. He then published three succeeding volumes under the title, Reports of Cases Ruled and Adjudged in the Several Courts of the United States, and of Pennsylvania, Held at the Seat of the Federal Government (1797, 1799, 1806). As the first reporter for Pennsylvania and United States Supreme Court reporter of decisions, these volumes began the series of both state and federal reports. These early reports are considered unofficial because Dallas carried out his work publishing the official United States Reports volumes from his own funds. The first Supreme Court case reported was West v. Barnes, 2 U.S. (Dall.) 401 (1791), and it was shortened so that it did not include the full seriatim opinions of the justices. The volumes of reports, of which he produced only four, were faulted for being incomplete, inaccurate, and extremely tardy. The landmark ruling in Chisholm v. Georgia (1793) which prompted the Eleventh Amendment, was not reported by Dallas until five years later, well after the Amendment had been ratified. Later, he wrote: "I have found such miserable encouragement for my reports that I have determined to call them all in, and devote them to the rats in the State-House." But his publications still serve as an important legal milestone in American legal publishing. He was a founder of the Democratic-Republican Societies in 1793.

== Secretary of the Commonwealth ==
Governor Thomas Mifflin named Dallas Secretary of the Commonwealth, a post he held from 1791 to 1801. Because Mifflin was an alcoholic, Dallas functioned as de facto governor for much of the late 1790s. Dallas helped found the Democratic-Republican party in Pennsylvania and advocated a strict construction of the new Constitution.

In 1798, Dallas represented Patrick Lyon, who was falsely accused in the 1798 Bank of Pennsylvania heist.

== U.S. Attorney and Secretary of the Treasury ==
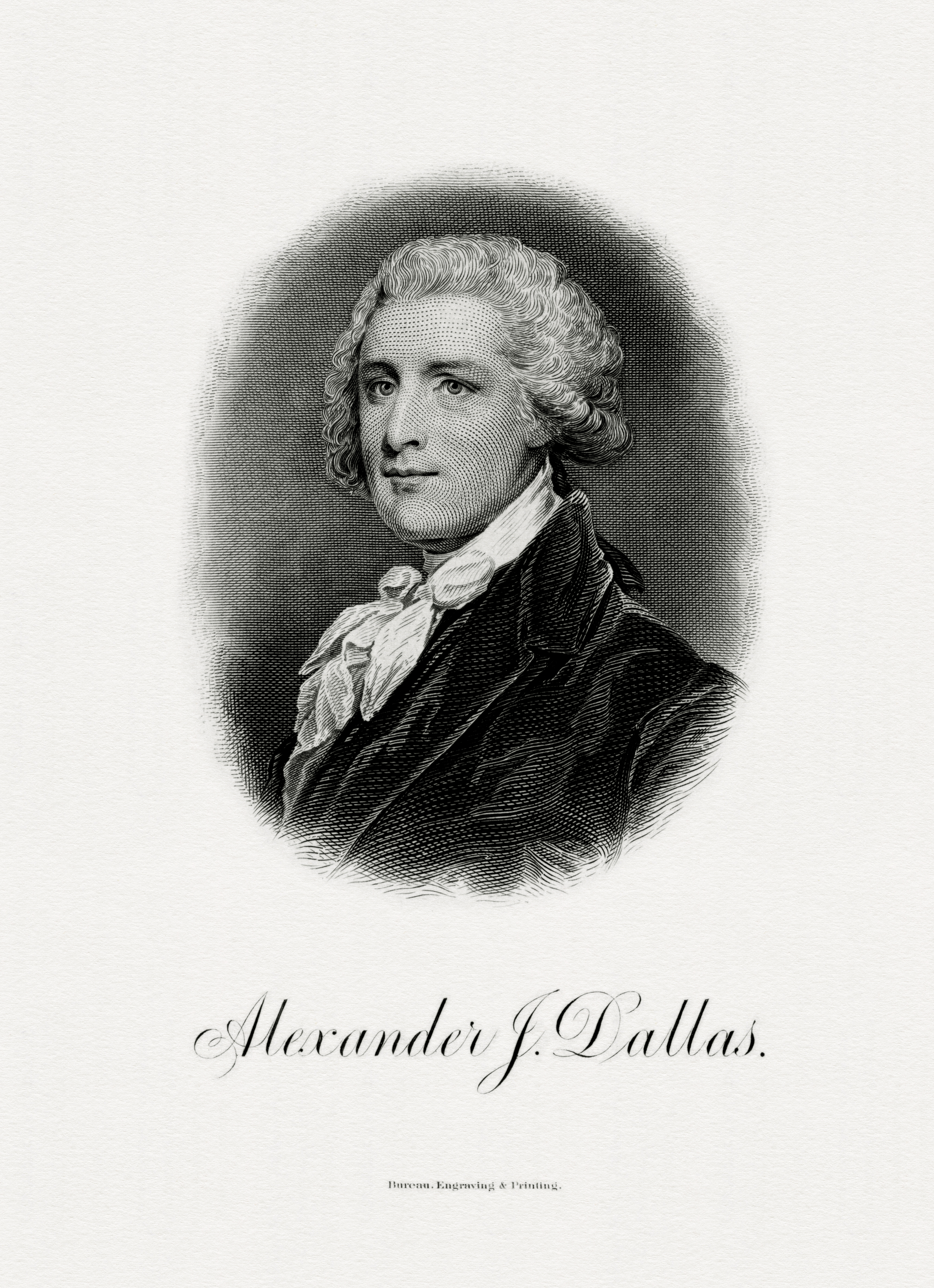
Bureau of Engraving and Printing portrait of Dallas as Secretary of the Treasury

In 1801, he was named United States Attorney for the Eastern District of Pennsylvania and served in that capacity until 1814. His friend Albert Gallatin was Treasury Secretary when the War of 1812 began and Dallas helped Gallatin obtain funds to fight Britain. The war nearly bankrupted the federal government by the time Dallas replaced Gallatin as Treasury Secretary. Dallas reorganized the Treasury Department, brought the government budget back into surplus, championed the creation of the Second Bank of the United States, and put the nation back on the specie system based on gold and silver.

== Acting Secretary of War and Acting Secretary of State ==
From March 2, 1815, to August 1, 1815, he was acting United States Secretary of War and for a time that year was also acting United States Secretary of State. He returned to Philadelphia, but lived only a year.

He was a member of the American Philosophical Society from 1791 and a trustee of the University of Pennsylvania.

== Honors ==
Dallas County, Alabama, and Dallas Township, Pennsylvania, are named for him. Six U.S. Coast Guard Cutters have been named Dallas, the most recent was USCGC Dallas (WHEC-716). Fort Dallas in Florida and the U.S. Navy ship USS Dallas (DD-199) were named after his son, Alexander J. Dallas, who died during his Navy service.

His other son George Mifflin Dallas was Vice President under James K. Polk and one possible namesake for Dallas, Texas; his father and brother are other possible namesakes of the Texas city.

His daughter, Sophia Burrell Dallas, married on April 4, 1805 Richard Bache, Jr., the son of Richard Bache, Sr. and Sarah Franklin Bache. Her husband's father was a marine insurance underwriter and importer in Philadelphia who served as United States Postmaster General from 1776 to 1782. Her husband's mother, known as Sally, was the only daughter of Benjamin Franklin, one of the Founding Fathers of the United States, and his common-law wife, Deborah Read.

Dallas was elected to the American Philosophical Society in 1791.

== See also ==
- Reporter of Decisions of the Supreme Court of the United States

Legal offices
| Preceded by (none) | Reporter of Decisions of the Supreme Court of the United States; 1790–1800 | Succeeded by William Cranch |
Political offices
| Preceded by George W. Campbell | U.S. Secretary of the Treasury; Served under: James Madison; 1814–1816 | Succeeded by William H. Crawford |
