= List of United States Supreme Court cases prior to the Marshall Court =

This is a partial chronological list of cases decided by the United States Supreme Court during the tenures of Chief Justices John Jay (October 19, 1789 – June 29, 1795), John Rutledge (August 12, 1795 – December 28, 1795), and Oliver Ellsworth (March 8, 1796 – December 15, 1800), respectively the Jay, Rutledge, and Ellsworth Courts.

== Jay Court ==
Supreme Court of the United States
Jay Court
- none ← → Rutledge Court
- October 19, 1789 – June 29, 1795 (5 years, 253 days)
- Seat: Old City Hall; Philadelphia, Pennsylvania
- No. of positions: 6
- Jay Court decisions

Case name	Citation	Summary
Beginning of active duty of Chief Justice John Jay, October 19, 1789
Van Staphorst v. Maryland	(1791)	first docketed case of the Supreme Court, settled before arguments
West v. Barnes	2 U.S. 401 (1791)	first decision of the Supreme Court, strictly interpreting procedural filing requirements mandated by statute. Justices delivered five seriatim opinions.
Georgia v. Brailsford	2 U.S. 402 (1792)	A State may sue in the Supreme Court to enjoin payment of a judgment on foreign debt until it can be ascertained to whom the money belongs
Hayburn's Case	2 U.S. 409 (1792)	justiciability and separation of powers
Georgia v. Brailsford	2 U.S. 415 (1793)	suits in which states may be a party; continuation of Georgia v. Brailsford (1792)
Chisholm v. Georgia	2 U.S. 419 (1793)	first “major” case; federal jurisdiction over suits vs. states; state sovereign immunity; led to Eleventh Amendment
Georgia v. Brailsford	3 U.S. 1 (1794)	first jury trial in the Supreme Court; conclusion of Georgia v. Brailsford (1792)
United States v. Todd	(1794)	Case regarding invalid pension of a Revolutionary War veteran. The case was initially unpublished, a note paraphrasing the case was appended to the opinion in United States v. Ferreira, 54 U.S. 40, 52 (1849). A transcript of the records of the case is published in Washington and Lee Law Review.

== Rutledge Court ==
Supreme Court of the United States
Rutledge Court
- Jay Court ← → Ellsworth Court
- August 12, 1795 – December 28, 1795 (138 days)
- Seat: Old City Hall; Philadelphia, Pennsylvania
- No. of positions: 6
- Rutledge Court decisions

Case name	Citation	Summary
Beginning of active duty of Chief Justice John Rutledge, August 12, 1795
United States v. Peters	3 U.S. 121 (1795)	Federal district court has no authority over a foreign privateer when the captured ship was not within its jurisdiction.
Talbot v. Jansen	3 U.S. 133 (1795)	United States citizens did not waive all claims to U.S. citizenship by either renouncing citizenship of an individual state or by becoming a citizen of another country.

== Ellsworth Court ==
Supreme Court of the United States
Ellsworth Court
- Rutledge Court ← → Marshall Court
- March 8, 1796 – December 15, 1800 (4 years, 282 days)
- Seat: Old City Hall; Philadelphia, Pennsylvania
- No. of positions: 6
- Ellsworth Court decisions

Case name	Citation	Summary
Beginning of active duty of Chief Justice Oliver Ellsworth, March 8, 1796
Hylton v. United States	3 U.S. 171 (1796)	tax on carriages
Hollingsworth v. Virginia	3 U.S. 378 (1798)	ratification of Eleventh Amendment, presidential approval is unnecessary for Constitutional amendment
Calder v. Bull	3 U.S. 386 (1798)	ex post facto clause applies to criminal, not civil cases
New York v. Connecticut	4 U.S. 1 (1799)	first original jurisdiction suit between two States
