= Rutledge Court =

Period of the US Supreme Court in 1795

Supreme Court of the United States
Rutledge Court
- Jay Court ← → Ellsworth Court
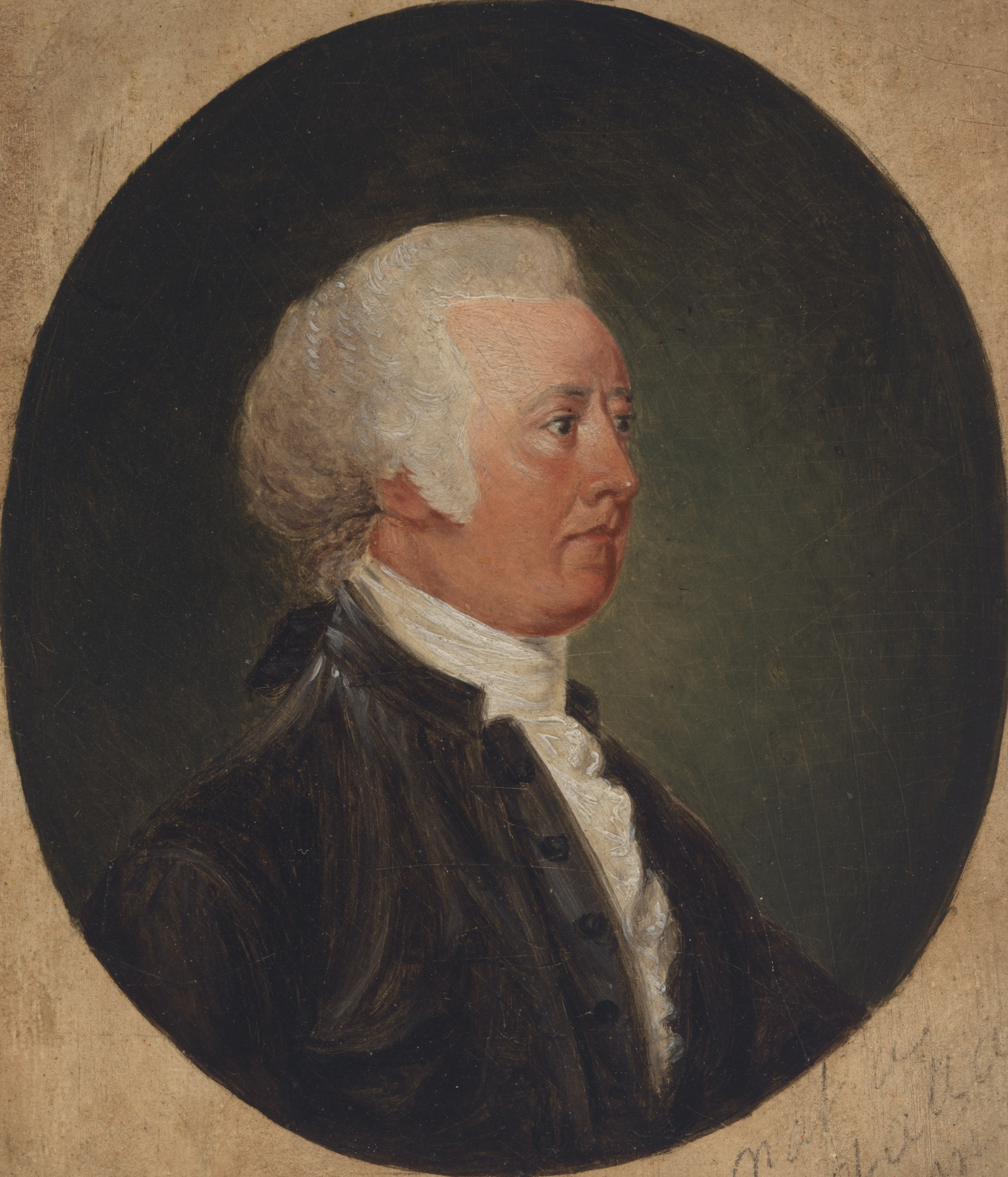
- Chief Justice John Rutledge
- August 12, 1795 – December 28, 1795 (138 days)
- Seat: Old City Hall; Philadelphia, Pennsylvania
- No. of positions: 6
- Rutledge Court decisions

The Rutledge Court refers to the Supreme Court of the United States from June to December 1795, when John Rutledge served as the second Chief Justice of the United States. Rutledge took office as a recess appointment of President George Washington to succeed John Jay. However, Rutledge was denied confirmation by the United States Senate, partly due to his attacks on the Jay Treaty. Rutledge was succeeded in office by Oliver Ellsworth. This was the first time that the Senate rejected a Supreme Court nomination; it remains the only time a "recess appointed" justice was not subsequently confirmed by the Senate. Rutledge's tenure as Chief Justice lasted for only 138 days, and the court only decided two cases under his leadership.

== Membership ==
The Rutledge Court consisted of Rutledge and five Associate Justices from the Jay Court: William Cushing, James Wilson, John Blair Jr., James Iredell, and William Paterson. Blair resigned on October 25, 1795, and was subsequently replaced by Samuel Chase in February 1796.

=== Timeline ===
Bar key: Washington appointee

== Rejection of Rutledge by the Senate ==
After the resignation of Chief Justice John Jay, President Washington selected Rutledge to succeed Jay as chief justice. As the Senate would not be meeting again until December, Washington gave Rutledge a recess appointment so that he could serve as chief justice during the upcoming August session. Rutledge was commissioned as chief justice on June 30, 1795 and took the judicial oath on August 12. On July 16, 1795, Rutledge gave a highly controversial speech denouncing the Jay Treaty with Great Britain. Rutledge's speech against the Jay Treaty cost him the support of many in the Washington administration, which supported the treaty, and in the Senate, which would soon be called upon to advise the president on his nomination of Rutledge to the judicial post and to consent to its ratification by a two-thirds vote.

By the time of his formal nomination to the Court on December 10, 1795, Rutledge's reputation was in tatters, and support for his nomination had faded. Rumors of mental illness and alcohol abuse swirled around him, concocted largely by the Federalist press. His words and actions in response to the Jay Treaty were used as evidence of his continued mental decline. The Senate rejected his appointment on December 15, 1795, by a vote of 10–14. Altogether, 9 Democratic-Republicans and 1 Federalist voted in favor of confirmation, while 14 Federalists voted against it; additionally, 5 Federalists and 1 Democratic-Republican did not vote. This was the first time that the Senate had voted down a Supreme Court nomination. As of 2026; it remains the only U.S. Supreme Court recess appointment to be subsequently rejected by the Senate. Though the Senate remained in session through June 1, 1796, which would have been the automatic end of Rutledge's commission following the rejection, Rutledge resigned from the Court two days later, on December 28, 1795. He served the briefest tenure of any Chief Justice of the United States (138 days).

== Rulings of the Court ==
The Rutledge Court, due in part to its brevity, issued only two rulings:

- United States v. Peters (1795): In a unanimous opinion authored by Chief Justice Rutledge, the Court ruled that federal district courts had no jurisdiction over crimes committed against Americans in international waters.
- Talbot v. Jansen (1795): In an opinion by Justice Paterson, the Court held that a citizen of the United States did not waive all claims to U.S. citizenship by either renouncing citizenship of an individual state or by becoming a citizen of another country, thus establishing precedent allowing for multiple citizenship by Americans.

== Other branches ==
The President during this court was George Washington. The Congress during this court was the 4th United States Congress.
