= Ellsworth Court =

Period of the US Supreme Court from 1796 to 1800

Supreme Court of the United States
Ellsworth Court
- Rutledge Court ← → Marshall Court
- Chief Justice Oliver Ellsworth
- March 8, 1796 – December 15, 1800 (4 years, 282 days)
- Seat: Old City Hall; Philadelphia, Pennsylvania
- No. of positions: 6
- Ellsworth Court decisions

The Ellsworth Court refers to the Supreme Court of the United States from 1796 to 1800, when Oliver Ellsworth served as the third Chief Justice of the United States. Ellsworth took office after the Senate refused to confirm the nomination of Chief Justice John Rutledge, who briefly served as a Chief Justice as a recess appointment. Ellsworth served as Chief Justice until his resignation, at which point John Marshall took office. With some exceptions, the Ellsworth Court was the last Supreme Court to use seriatim opinions.

== Membership ==
The Ellsworth Court began in 1796 when the Senate confirmed President George Washington's appointment of Ellsworth. Washington had previously nominated both Rutledge and Associate Justice William Cushing to the seat, but Rutledge's nomination was denied by the Senate and Cushing refused the nomination on the basis of his health. The Ellsworth Court began with Ellsworth and four Associate Justices from the Jay Court: William Cushing, James Wilson, James Iredell, and William Paterson. Associate Justice Samuel Chase took office shortly after Ellsworth's tenure began, filling the vacancy caused by the resignation of John Blair, Jr. during the Rutledge Court. Wilson died in 1798, and President John Adams appointed Bushrod Washington to take his seat. Alfred Moore joined the court in 1800 after the death of Iredell.

=== Timeline ===
Bar key: Washington appointee J. Adams appointee

== Other branches ==
Presidents during this court included George Washington and John Adams. Congresses during this court included 4th through the 6th United States Congresses.

== Rulings of the Court ==
The Ellsworth Court issued some notable rulings:

- Hollingsworth v. Virginia (1798): In a per curiam opinion, the court ruled that the president plays no part in amending the Constitution.
- Calder v. Bull (1798): In an opinion written by Justice Chase, the court held that the Constitutional prohibition on ex post facto laws applies only to criminal acts, and that the Supreme Court of United States has no authority to determine whether state laws violate state constitutions.

The Ellsworth Court exercised the Supreme Court's original jurisdiction for the first time in history in its review of a land dispute between New York and Connecticut.
