= Jay Court =

Period of the US Supreme Court from 1789 to 1795

Supreme Court of the United States
Jay Court
- None ← → Rutledge Court
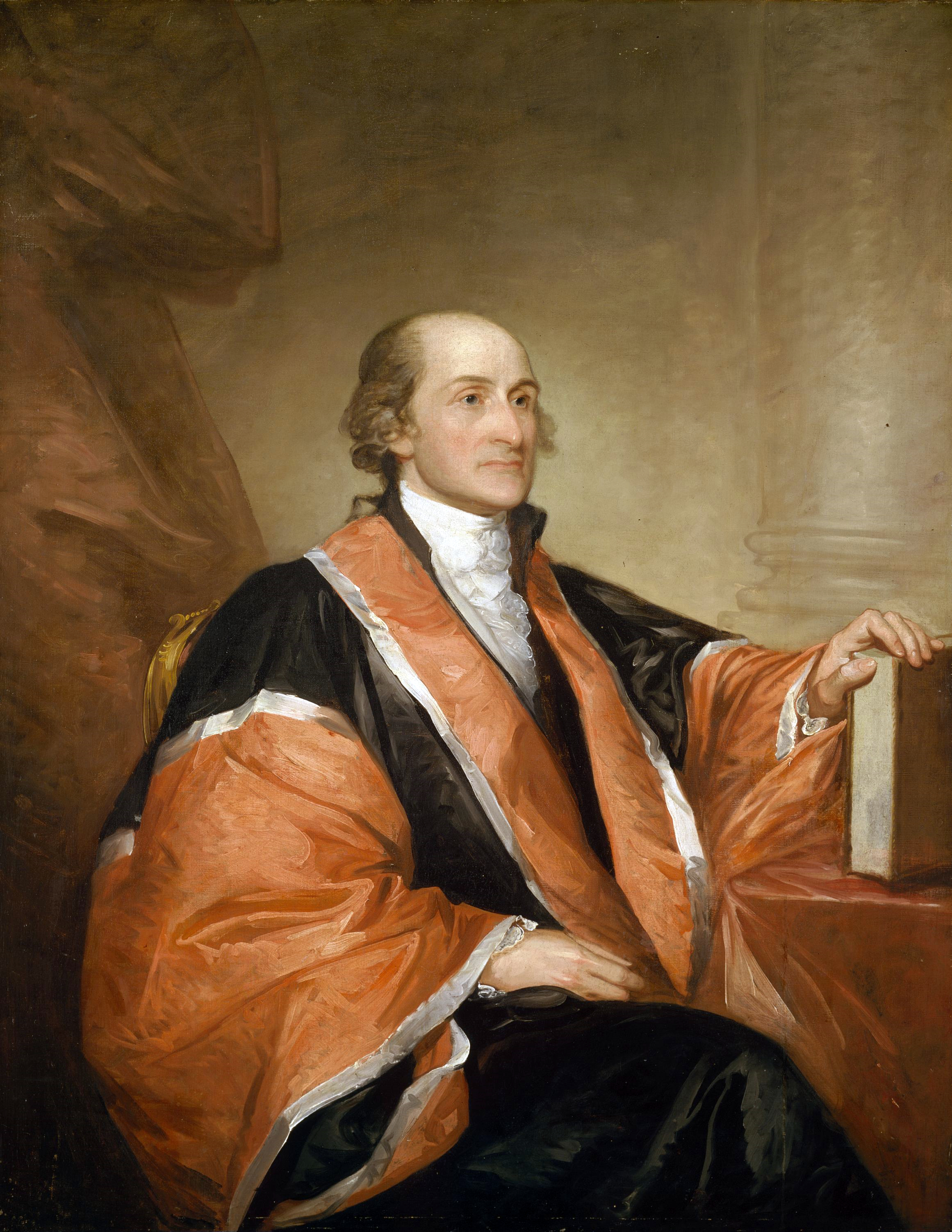
- Chief Justice John Jay
- October 19, 1789 – June 29, 1795 (5 years, 253 days)
- Seat: Old City Hall; Philadelphia, Pennsylvania
- No. of positions: 6
- Jay Court decisions

The Jay Court refers to the Supreme Court of the United States from 1789 to 1795, when John Jay served as the first Chief Justice of the United States. Jay served as Chief Justice until his resignation, at which point John Rutledge took office as a recess appointment. The Supreme Court was established in Article III of the United States Constitution, but the workings of the federal court system were largely laid out by the Judiciary Act of 1789, which established a six-member Supreme Court, composed of one Chief Justice and five Associate Justices. As the first President, George Washington was responsible for appointing the entire Supreme Court. The act also created thirteen judicial districts, along with district courts and circuit courts for each district.

The Court held its inaugural session on February 2, 1790, at the Royal Exchange in New York City. However, with no cases on the docket and little pressing business, the term lasted for only eight days. It was not until August 1791 that the Court issued its first decision. That same year, the Court moved with the rest of the federal government to Philadelphia.

The Court's business through its first three years primarily involved the establishment of rules and procedure; reading of commissions and admission of attorneys to the bar; and the Justices' duties in circuit riding, to preside over cases in the circuit courts of the various federal judicial districts. It heard only four cases during Jay's chief justiceship.

During his tenure, Jay established an early precedent for the Court's independence in 1790, when Treasury Secretary Alexander Hamilton wrote to him requesting an advisory opinion on proposed legislation supported by the president. Jay replied that the Court's business was restricted to ruling on the constitutionality of cases being tried before it and refused to allow it to take a position either for or against the legislation. This established a precedent that the Court only hears cases and controversies.

== Membership ==
In September 1789, Washington nominated John Jay, who previously served as US Secretary of Foreign Affairs, as the first Chief Justice and nominated John Rutledge, William Cushing, James Wilson, John Blair Jr., and Robert Harrison as Associate Justices. All were quickly confirmed by the Senate, with Wilson being the first to take the prescribed oaths of office—on October 5, 1789—and to be fully vested as a member of the Supreme Court. Then, after Harrison declined the appointment, Washington appointed James Iredell in 1790. Rutledge resigned in 1791 and was replaced by Thomas Johnson, who resigned in 1793. Johnson was replaced by William Paterson.

The justices represented every region of the country, as Washington emphasized geographical balance in making his appointments. The Jay Court ended in 1795, when Jay resigned to become Governor of New York. Jay was replaced via recess appointment by John Rutledge, though Rutledge was denied confirmation by the Senate. Oliver Ellsworth became the third Chief Justice in 1796.

=== Timeline ===
Note: The red vertical line denotes September 24, 1789, the date on which the U.S. federal judiciary was established by Congress.
The green vertical line denotes February 2, 1790, the date on which the U.S. Supreme Court convened for the first time.
Bar key: Washington appointee

== Other branches ==
The President during this court was George Washington. Congresses during this court included the 1st through 4th United States Congresses.

== Gallery ==
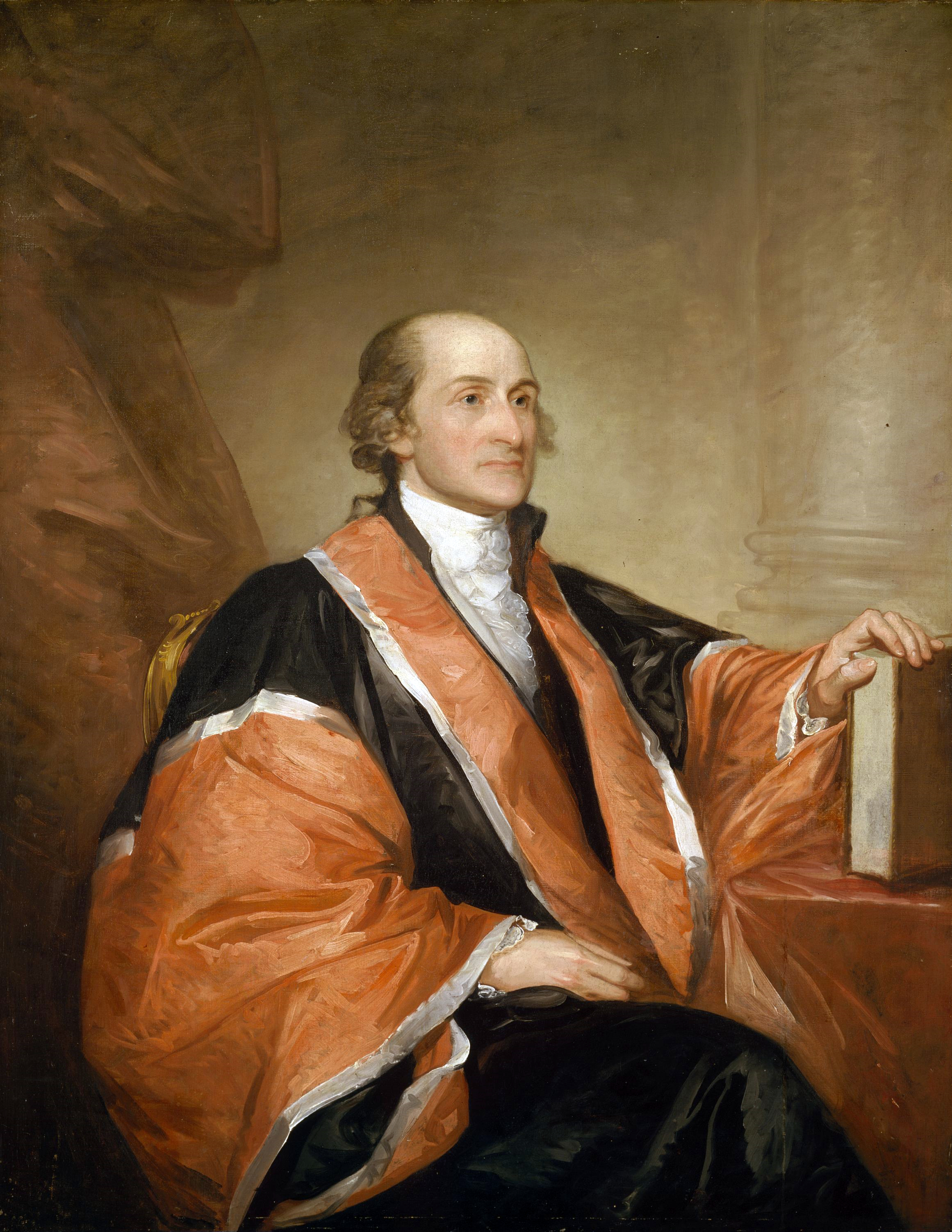
Portrait of John Jay, 1794

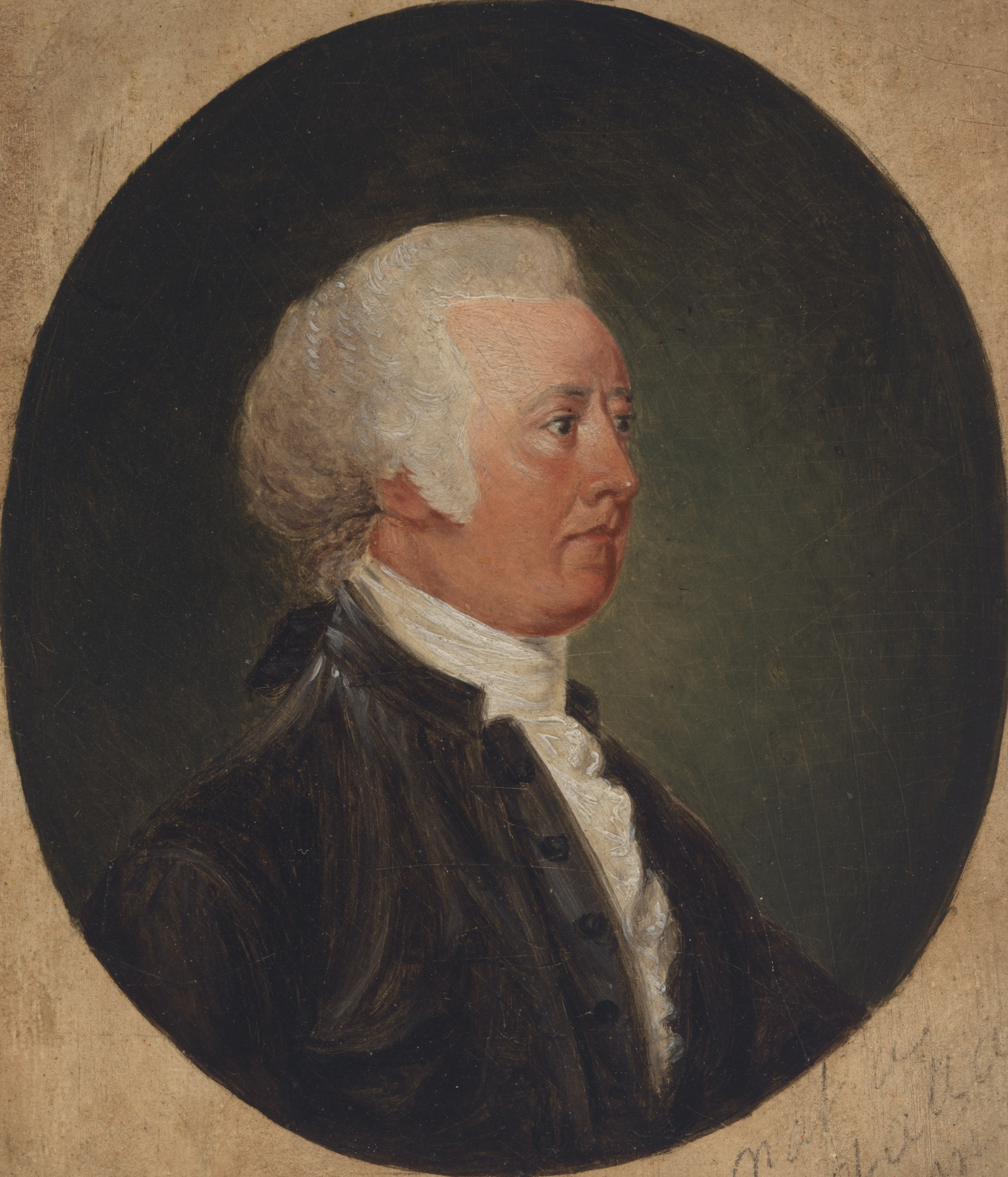
John Rutledge

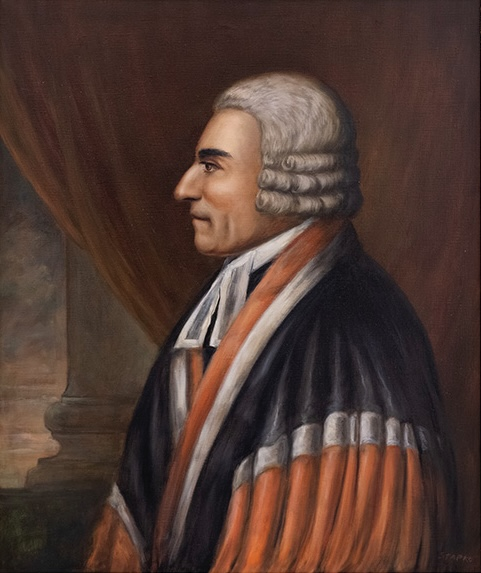
William Cushing

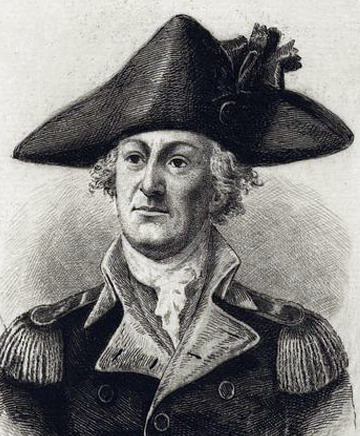
Robert Hanson Harrison

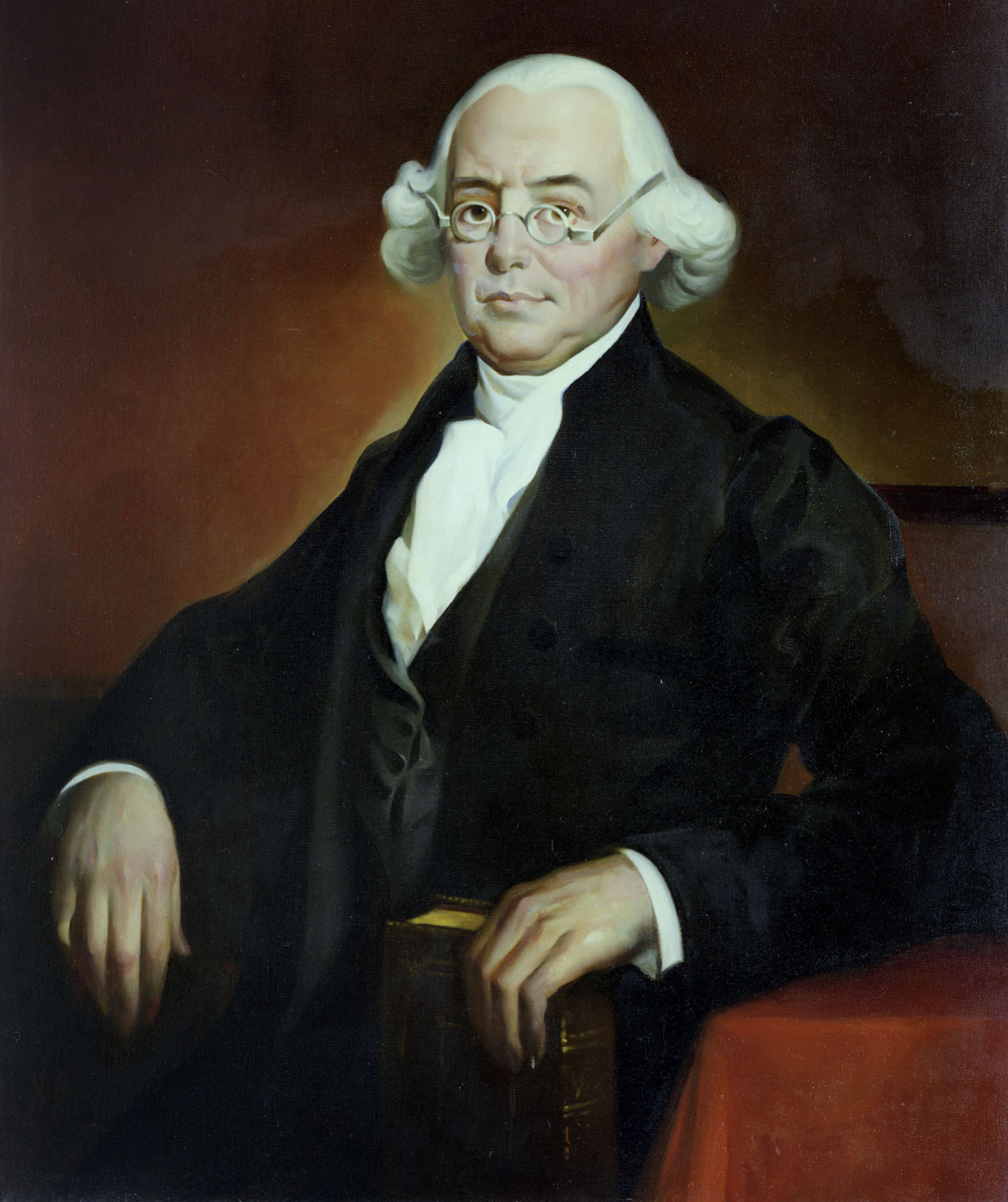
James Wilson

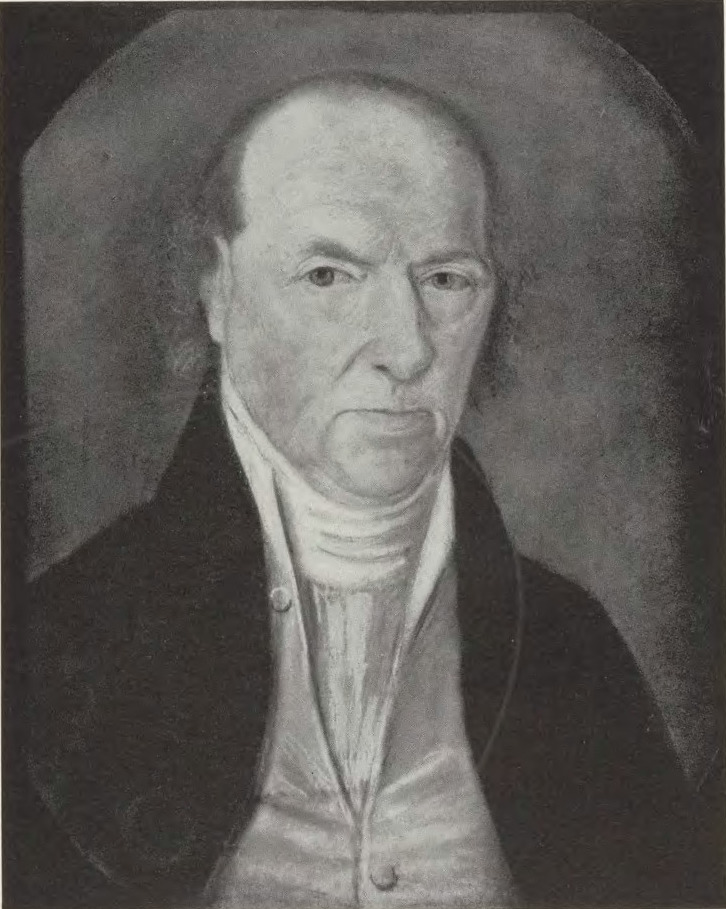
John Blair

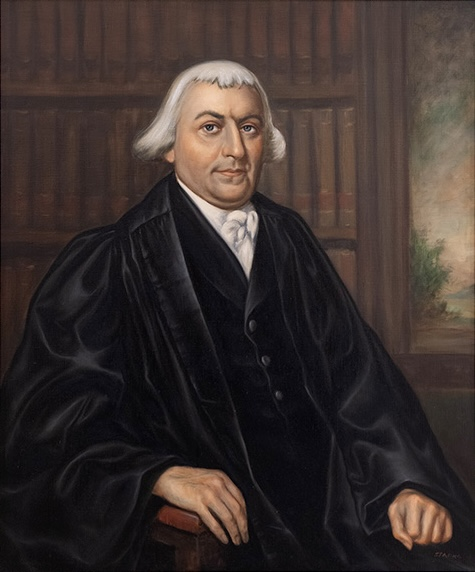
James Iredell

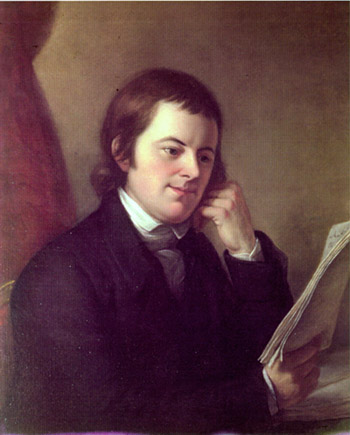
Thomas Johnson

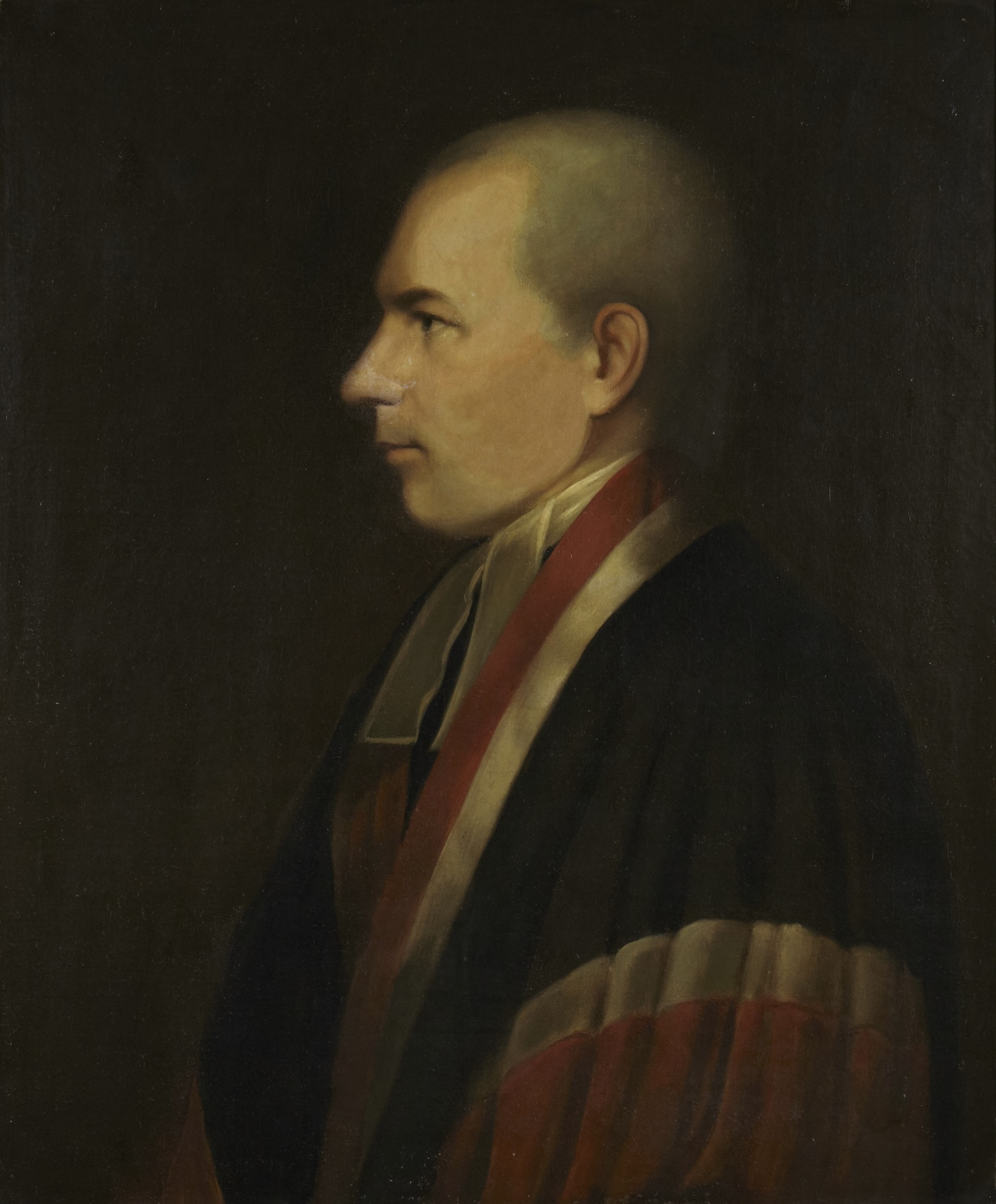
William Paterson

The justices are depicted from left to right in order of their seniority, as determined by the date on their respective commissions as justices, in accordance with the Judiciary Act of 1789. While Justice Wilson was the first associate justice to take the oath of office, initially he was to be fourth in precedence among the associate justices. President Washington appointed the initial justices of the Jay Court in the following order:

- Sept. 26, 1789: John Jay, John Rutledge
- Sept. 27: William Cushing
- Sept. 28: Robert Harrison (declined)
- Sept. 29: James Wilson
- Sept. 30: John Blair.

== Rulings of the Court ==
The Jay Court did not issue many major rulings, but Chisholm v. Georgia (1793) stands as the first important ruling of the Supreme Court. The court held that the state of Georgia could be sued in federal court, establishing an important precedent that the states of the union do not constitute fully sovereign states. However, the Eleventh Amendment, ratified in 1795, granted states sovereign immunity from suits in federal court by citizens of another state.

== See also ==
- Federal judiciary of the United States
- Separation of powers
