= Justice Rutledge =

Justice Rutledge may refer to:

- John Rutledge (1739–1800), associate justice and chief justice of the United States Supreme Court
- Wiley Rutledge (1894–1949), associate justice of the United States Supreme Court
