= United States v. Peters =

United States v. Peters is the short case name of two United States Supreme Court decisions, both involving Richard Peters in his role as a United States district judge.

- United States v. Peters, 3 U.S. 121 (1795), determining that the federal district court has no jurisdiction over a foreign privateer where the intended captured ship was not within the jurisdiction of the court
- United States v. Peters, 9 U.S. 115 (1809)

It may also refer to the case United States v. Peters, (N.D. Ind. 2012) cited in the Supreme Court decision Florida v. Jardines.
