= Old City Hall (Philadelphia) =

- U.S. Historic district – Contributing property
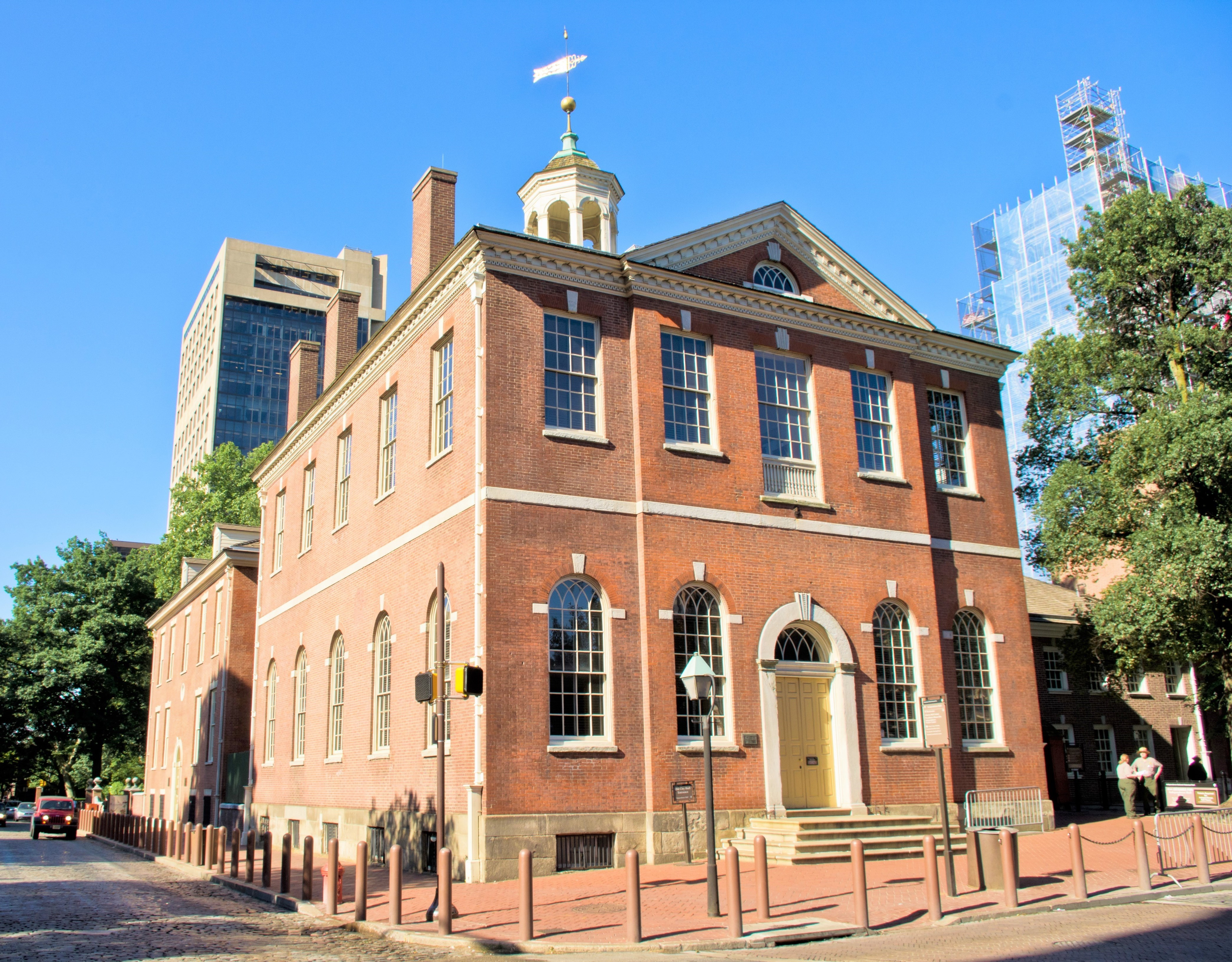
- Old City Hall in Philadelphia, 2011

- Location within Philadelphia Location within Pennsylvania Location within the United States
- Location: Chestnut Street at 5th Street; Philadelphia, Pennsylvania, U.S.
- Coordinates: 39°56′52″N 75°8′53″W
- Built: 1790–91
- Architect: David Evans, Jr.
- Architectural style: Federal
- Part of: Independence National Historical Park (ID66000683)
- Added to NRHP: October 15, 1966

Old City Hall, located at Chestnut and 5th Streets in the Independence Hall complex of Independence National Historical Park in Center City Philadelphia, was built in 1790–91 in the Federal style. The architect was David Evans, Jr.

Originally intended as Philadelphia's City Hall, it housed the Supreme Court of the United States from the completion of its construction in 1791 until 1800, when the national capital was moved to Washington, D.C. Three chief justices, John Jay (Jay Court), John Rutledge (Rutledge Court), and Oliver Ellsworth (Ellsworth Court), officiated the Supreme Court from this location.

After the national capital moved to Washington, D.C., the building continued to serve as Philadelphia's City Hall until 1854. It is a contributing property to Independence National Historical Park and is owned by the City of Philadelphia, which leases the building to the National Park Service.

== See also ==
- Congress Hall
