= List of United States Supreme Court cases, volume 54 =

Supreme Court of the United States
- Interactive map of Supreme Court of the United States
- 38°53′26″N 77°00′16″W
- Established: March 4, 1789; 236 years ago
- Location: Washington, D.C.
- Coordinates: 38°53′26″N 77°00′16″W
- Composition method: Presidential nomination with Senate confirmation
- Authorised by: Constitution of the United States, Art. III, § 1
- Judge term length: life tenure, subject to impeachment and removal
- Number of positions: 9 (by statute)
- Website: supremecourt.gov

This is a list of cases reported in volume 54 (13 How.) of United States Reports, decided by the Supreme Court of the United States in 1852.

== Nominative reports ==
In 1874, the U.S. government created the United States Reports, and retroactively numbered older privately published case reports as part of the new series. As a result, cases appearing in volumes 1–90 of U.S. Reports have dual citation forms; one for the volume number of U.S. Reports, and one for the volume number of the reports named for the relevant reporter of decisions (these are called "nominative reports").

=== Benjamin Chew Howard ===
Starting with the 42nd volume of U.S. Reports, the Reporter of Decisions of the Supreme Court of the United States was Benjamin Chew Howard. Howard was Reporter of Decisions from 1843 to 1860, covering volumes 42 through 65 of United States Reports which correspond to volumes 1 through 24 of his Howard's Reports. As such, the dual form of citation to, for example, Mitchell v. Harmony is 54 U.S. (13 How.) 115 (1852).

== Justices of the Supreme Court at the time of 54 U.S. (13 How.) ==
The Supreme Court is established by Article III, Section 1 of the Constitution of the United States, which says: "The judicial Power of the United States, shall be vested in one supreme Court . . .". The size of the Court is not specified; the Constitution leaves it to Congress to set the number of justices. Under the Judiciary Act of 1789 Congress originally fixed the number of justices at six (one chief justice and five associate justices). Since 1789 Congress has varied the size of the Court from six to seven, nine, ten, and back to nine justices (always including one chief justice).

When the cases in 54 U.S. (13 How.) were decided the Court comprised these nine members:

Portrait	Justice	Office	Home State	Succeeded	Date confirmed by the Senate (Vote)	Tenure on Supreme Court
	Roger B. Taney	Chief Justice	Maryland	John Marshall	March 15, 1836 (29–15)	March 28, 1836 – October 12, 1864 (Died)
	John McLean	Associate Justice	Ohio	Robert Trimble	March 7, 1829 (Acclamation)	January 11, 1830 – April 4, 1861 (Died)
	James Moore Wayne	Associate Justice	Georgia	William Johnson	January 9, 1835 (Acclamation)	January 14, 1835 – July 5, 1867 (Died)
	John Catron	Associate Justice	Tennessee	newly created seat	March 8, 1837 (28–15)	May 1, 1837 – May 30, 1865 (Died)
	John McKinley	Associate Justice	Alabama	newly created seat	September 25, 1837 (Acclamation)	January 9, 1838 – July 19, 1852 (Died)
	Peter Vivian Daniel	Associate Justice	Virginia	Philip P. Barbour	March 2, 1841 (25–5)	January 10, 1842 – May 31, 1860 (Died)
	Samuel Nelson	Associate Justice	New York	Smith Thompson	February 14, 1845 (Acclamation)	February 27, 1845 – November 28, 1872 (Retired)
	Robert Cooper Grier	Associate Justice	Pennsylvania	Henry Baldwin	August 4, 1846 (Acclamation)	August 10, 1846 – January 31, 1870 (Retired)
	Benjamin Robbins Curtis	Associate Justice	Massachusetts	Levi Woodbury	December 20, 1851 (Acclamation)	October 10, 1851 – September 30, 1857 (Resigned)

== Citation style ==
Under the Judiciary Act of 1789 the federal court structure at the time comprised District Courts, which had general trial jurisdiction; Circuit Courts, which had mixed trial and appellate (from the US District Courts) jurisdiction; and the United States Supreme Court, which had appellate jurisdiction over the federal District and Circuit courts—and for certain issues over state courts. The Supreme Court also had limited original jurisdiction (i.e., in which cases could be filed directly with the Supreme Court without first having been heard by a lower federal or state court). There were one or more federal District Courts and/or Circuit Courts in each state, territory, or other geographical region.

Bluebook citation style is used for case names, citations, and jurisdictions.

- "C.C.D." = United States Circuit Court for the District of . . .
  - e.g.,"C.C.D.N.J." = United States Circuit Court for the District of New Jersey
- "D." = United States District Court for the District of . . .
  - e.g.,"D. Mass." = United States District Court for the District of Massachusetts
- "E." = Eastern; "M." = Middle; "N." = Northern; "S." = Southern; "W." = Western
  - e.g.,"C.C.S.D.N.Y." = United States Circuit Court for the Southern District of New York
  - e.g.,"M.D. Ala." = United States District Court for the Middle District of Alabama
- "Ct. Cl." = United States Court of Claims
- The abbreviation of a state's name alone indicates the highest appellate court in that state's judiciary at the time.
  - e.g.,"Pa." = Supreme Court of Pennsylvania
  - e.g.,"Me." = Supreme Judicial Court of Maine

== List of cases in 54 U.S. (13 How.) ==
Case Name	Page & year	Opinion of the Court	Concurring opinion(s)	Dissenting opinion(s)	Lower Court	Disposition
United States v. Hughes I	1 (1852)	Nelson	none	none	E.D. La.	reversed
United States v. Hughes II	4 (1852)	Nelson	none	none	E.D. La.	reversed
United States v. Hughes III	7 (1852)	Nelson	none	none	E.D. La.	reversed
United States v. Pillerin	9 (1852)	Taney	none	none	E.D. La.	reversed
Crawford v. Points	11 (1852)	Taney	none	none	W.D. Va.	dismissed
Darrington v. Bank of Ala.	12 (1852)	McLean	none	none	Ala.	affirmed
Ballance v. Forsyth	18 (1852)	McLean	none	none	C.C.D. Ill.	affirmed
Doe v. Beebe	25 (1852)	Taney	none	none	Ala.	affirmed
McCormick v. Gray	26 (1852)	Curtis	none	none	C.C.D. Ill.	reversed
United States v. Ferreira	40 (1852)	Taney	none	none	N.D. Fla.	dismissed
Barrow v. Hill	54 (1852)	Taney	none	none	C.C.E.D. La.	affirmed
Bradford v. Union Bank	57 (1852)	Nelson	none	none	N.D. Miss.	reversed
Richmond et al. R.R. Co. v. Louisa R.R. Co.	71 (1852)	Grier	none	Curtis	Va.	affirmed
Parish v. Murphree	92 (1852)	McLean	none	none	N.D. Ala.	reversed
Williamson v. Barrett	101 (1852)	Nelson	none	Catron	C.C.D. Ohio	affirmed
Mitchell v. Harmony	115 (1852)	Taney	none	Daniel	C.C.S.D.N.Y.	affirmed
Buckingham v. McLean I	150 (1852)	McLean	none	none	C.C.D. Ohio	dismissal denied
Buckingham v. McLean II	151 (1852)	Curtis	none	none	C.C.D. Ohio	affirmed
Hogan v. Ross	173 (1852)	Daniel	none	none	N.D. Miss.	affirmed
Coffee v. Planters Bank	183 (1852)	Daniel	none	none	S.D. Miss.	affirmed
Weems v. George	190 (1852)	Grier	none	none	C.C.E.D. La.	affirmed
Lord v. Goddard	198 (1852)	Catron	none	none	C.C.D.N.H.	reversed
Morsell v. Hall	212 (1852)	Taney	none	none	C.C.D. Md.	affirmed
United States v. McCullagh	216 (1852)	Taney	none	none	C.C.E.D. La.	reversed
Miller v. Austen	218 (1852)	Catron	none	none	C.C.D. Ohio	affirmed
Saltmarsh v. Tuthill	229 (1852)	Catron	none	none	M.D. Ala.	affirmed
Tyler v. Black	230 (1852)	Wayne	none	none	C.C.D. Me.	reversed
Campbell v. Doe	244 (1852)	McLean	none	none	Ohio	affirmed
Glenn v. United States	250 (1852)	Catron	none	none	D. Ark.	affirmed
De Vilemont's Heirs v. United States	261 (1852)	Catron	none	none	D. Ark.	affirmed
Neves v. Scott	268 (1852)	Curtis	none	none	C.C.D. Ga.	reversed
De Forest v. Lawrence	274 (1852)	Nelson	none	none	C.C.S.D.N.Y.	affirmed
Walsh v. Rogers	283 (1852)	Grier	none	none	C.C.E.D. La.	affirmed
Taylor v. Doe	287 (1852)	Daniel	none	none	N.D. Miss.	reversed
Tremlett v. Adams	295 (1852)	Taney	none	none	C.C.D. Mass.	affirmed
Philadelphia et al. R.R. Co. v. Howard	307 (1852)	Curtis	none	none	C.C.D. Md.	affirmed
Very v. Levy	345 (1852)	Curtis	none	none	C.C.D. Ark.	affirmed
Day v. Woodworth	363 (1852)	Grier	none	none	C.C.D. Mass.	affirmed
Fowler v. Hart	373 (1852)	McLean	none	none	C.C.E.D. La.	affirmed
Howard v. Ingersoll	381 (1852)	Wayne	Nelson; Curtis	none	multiple	reversed
Norris v. Crocker	429 (1852)	Catron	none	none	C.C.D. Ind.	certification
Rogers v. Lindsey	441 (1852)	Nelson	none	none	C.C.S.D. Ala.	reversed
McAfee v. Crofford	447 (1852)	McLean	none	none	N.D. Miss.	affirmed
Hill v. Tucker	458 (1852)	Wayne	none	none	C.C.E.D. La.	reversed
Goodall v. Tucker	469 (1852)	Wayne	none	none	C.C.E.D. La.	reversed
Pillow v. Roberts	472 (1852)	Grier	none	none	C.C.E.D. Ark.	reversed
United States v. Hodge	478 (1852)	Daniel	none	none	C.C.E.D. La.	reversed
Lawrence v. Caswell	488 (1852)	Taney	none	none	C.C.S.D.N.Y.	reversed
Jecker v. Montgomery	498 (1852)	Taney	none	none	C.C.D.C.	reversed
Pennsylvania v. Wheeling & B.B. Co.	518 (1852)	McLean	none	Taney; Daniel	original	decree for Pa.

== See also ==
- certificate of division
