= List of justices of the Supreme Court of the United States by seat =

The Supreme Court of the United States is the highest ranking judicial body in the United States. Established by Article III of the Constitution, the detailed structure of the Court was laid down by the 1st United States Congress in 1789. Congress specified the Court's original and appellate jurisdiction, created 13 judicial districts, and fixed the number of justices at six – one chief justice and five associate justices. The number of justices on the Supreme Court changed six times before settling at the present total of nine in 1869.

The following tables detail the succession of justices of the Supreme Court of the United States by seat. There are no formal numbers or names for the individual seats of associate justices, which are listed in this article simply by number, as well as by the date each was established by Congress. The numbering of associate justice seats 1–4 reflects the order of precedence of the inaugural justices to occupy those seats, which was based upon the seniority of their commission from President George Washington following their confirmation by the U.S. Senate. The fifth original associate justice seat, and the simultaneously created seventh and eighth seats, are numbered according to the order in which each seat's first occupant received their commission from the president following Senate confirmation. Seats six, nine, and ten are numbered according to the order in which each was created by statute. The start date is the date the justice took the judicial oath of office, and the end date is the date of the justice's death, resignation, or retirement.

== Original seats ==
The Judiciary Act of 1789 (1 Stat. 73) set the number of Supreme Court justices at six: one chief justice and five associate justices. One of the associate justice seats established in 1789 (seat 5 below) was later abolished, as a result of the Judicial Circuits Act of 1866 (14 Stat. 209), which provided for the gradual elimination of seats on the Supreme Court until there would be seven justices.

Chief Justice
Established September 24, 1789 per Judiciary Act of 1789
Jay	October 19, 1789 – June 29, 1795
J. Rutledge	August 12, 1795 – December 15, 1795
Ellsworth	March 8, 1796 – December 15, 1800
J. Marshall	February 4, 1801 – July 6, 1835
Taney	March 28, 1836 – October 12, 1864
S. P. Chase	December 15, 1864 – May 7, 1873
Waite	March 4, 1874 – March 23, 1888
Fuller	October 8, 1888 – July 4, 1910
E. White	December 19, 1910 – May 19, 1921
Taft	July 11, 1921 – February 3, 1930
Hughes	February 24, 1930 – June 30, 1941
Stone	July 3, 1941 – April 22, 1946
Vinson	June 24, 1946 – September 8, 1953
Warren	October 5, 1953 – June 23, 1969
Burger	June 23, 1969 – September 26, 1986
Rehnquist	September 26, 1986 – September 3, 2005
J. Roberts	September 29, 2005 – present

Associate Justice 1
Established September 24, 1789 per Judiciary Act of 1789
J. Rutledge	February 15, 1790 – March 5, 1791
T. Johnson	September 19, 1791 – January 16, 1793
Paterson	March 11, 1793 – September 9, 1806
Livingston	January 20, 1807 – March 18, 1823
Thompson	September 1, 1823 – December 18, 1843
Nelson	February 27, 1845 – November 28, 1872
Hunt	January 9, 1873 – January 27, 1882
Blatchford	April 3, 1882 – July 7, 1893
E. White	March 12, 1894 – December 18, 1910^{CJ}
Van Devanter	January 3, 1911 – June 2, 1937
Black	August 19, 1937 – September 17, 1971
Powell	January 7, 1972 – June 26, 1987
Kennedy	February 18, 1988 – July 31, 2018
Kavanaugh	October 6, 2018 – present

Associate Justice 2
Established September 24, 1789 per Judiciary Act of 1789
Cushing	February 2, 1790 – September 13, 1810
Story	February 3, 1812 – September 10, 1845
Woodbury	September 23, 1845 – September 4, 1851
Curtis	October 10, 1851 – September 30, 1857
Clifford	January 21, 1858 – July 25, 1881
Gray	January 9, 1882 – September 15, 1902
Holmes	December 8, 1902 – January 12, 1932
Cardozo	March 14, 1932 – July 9, 1938
Frankfurter	January 30, 1939 – August 28, 1962
Goldberg	October 1, 1962 – July 25, 1965
Fortas	October 4, 1965 – May 14, 1969
Blackmun	June 9, 1970 – August 3, 1994
Breyer	August 3, 1994 – June 30, 2022
K. Jackson	June 30, 2022 – present

Associate Justice 3
Established September 24, 1789 per Judiciary Act of 1789
Wilson	October 5, 1789 – August 21, 1798
Washington	November 9, 1798 – November 26, 1829
Baldwin	January 18, 1830 – April 21, 1844
Grier	August 10, 1846 – January 31, 1870
Strong	March 14, 1870 – December 14, 1880
Woods	January 5, 1881 – May 14, 1887
L. Lamar	January 18, 1888 – January 23, 1893
H. Jackson	March 4, 1893 – August 8, 1895
Peckham	January 6, 1896 – October 24, 1909
Lurton	January 3, 1910 – July 12, 1914
McReynolds	October 12, 1914 – January 31, 1941
Byrnes	July 8, 1941 – October 3, 1942
W. Rutledge	February 15, 1943 – September 10, 1949
Minton	October 12, 1949 – October 15, 1956
Brennan	October 16, 1956 – July 20, 1990
Souter	October 9, 1990 – June 29, 2009
Sotomayor	August 8, 2009 – present

Associate Justice 4
Established September 24, 1789 per Judiciary Act of 1789
Blair	February 2, 1790 – October 25, 1795
S. Chase	February 4, 1796 – June 19, 1811
Duvall	November 23, 1811 – January 14, 1835
Barbour	May 12, 1836 – February 25, 1841
Daniel	January 10, 1842 – May 31, 1860
Miller	July 21, 1862 – October 13, 1890
Brown	January 5, 1891 – May 28, 1906
Moody	December 17, 1906 – November 20, 1910
J. Lamar	January 3, 1911 – January 2, 1916
Brandeis	June 5, 1916 – February 13, 1939
Douglas	April 17, 1939 – November 12, 1975
Stevens	December 19, 1975 – June 29, 2010
Kagan	August 7, 2010 – present

Associate Justice 5
Established September 24, 1789 per Judiciary Act of 1789
Iredell	May 12, 1790 – October 20, 1799
Moore	April 21, 1800 – January 26, 1804
W. Johnson	May 7, 1804 – August 4, 1834
Wayne	January 14, 1835 – July 5, 1867
Seat abolished July 5, 1867 per Judicial Circuits Act

== Additional seats ==
In 1807, Congress passed the Seventh Circuit Act (2 Stat. 420), which added a sixth associate justice to the Supreme Court. Two more seats were added in 1837, as a result of the Eighth and Ninth Circuits Act (5 Stat. 176); one of these (seat 7 below) was later abolished as a result of the Judicial Circuits Act of 1866. The Supreme Court reached its peak size in 1863, when the Tenth Circuit Act (12 Stat. 794) became law, and a tenth justice joined the Court. After fluctuating from nine to ten to eight members over a six-year period, the size of the Court was restored to nine members through the Circuit Judges Act of 1869 (16 Stat. 44), a broad Reconstruction era reorganization of the federal courts. This act remains the governing law regarding the number of seats on the Court.

Associate Justice 6
Established February 24, 1807 per Seventh Circuit Act
Todd	May 4, 1807 – February 7, 1826
Trimble	June 16, 1826 – August 25, 1828
McLean	March 12, 1829 – April 4, 1861
Swayne	January 27, 1862 – January 24, 1881
Matthews	May 17, 1881 – March 22, 1889
Brewer	January 6, 1890 – March 28, 1910
Hughes	October 10, 1910 – June 10, 1916
Clarke	October 9, 1916 – September 18, 1922
Sutherland	October 2, 1922 – January 17, 1938
Reed	January 31, 1938 – February 25, 1957
Whittaker	March 25, 1957 – March 31, 1962
B. White	April 16, 1962 – June 28, 1993
Ginsburg	August 10, 1993 – September 18, 2020
Barrett	October 27, 2020 – present

Associate Justice 7
Established March 3, 1837 per Eighth and Ninth Circuits Act
Catron	May 1, 1837 – May 30, 1865
Abolished July 23, 1866 per Judicial Circuits Act

Associate Justice 8
Established March 3, 1837 per Eighth and Ninth Circuits Act
McKinley	January 9, 1838 – July 19, 1852
Campbell	April 11, 1853 – April 30, 1861
Davis	December 10, 1862 – March 4, 1877
J. M. Harlan	December 10, 1877 – October 14, 1911
Pitney	March 18, 1912 – December 31, 1922
Sanford	February 19, 1923 – March 8, 1930
O. Roberts	June 2, 1930 – July 31, 1945
Burton	October 1, 1945 – October 13, 1958
Stewart	October 14, 1958 – July 3, 1981
O'Connor	September 25, 1981 – January 31, 2006
Alito	January 31, 2006 – present

Associate Justice 9
Established March 3, 1863 per Tenth Circuit Act
Field	May 20, 1863 – December 1, 1897
McKenna	January 26, 1898 – January 5, 1925
Stone	March 2, 1925 – July 2, 1941^{CJ}
R. Jackson	July 11, 1941 – October 9, 1954
J. M. Harlan II	March 28, 1955 – September 23, 1971
Rehnquist	January 7, 1972 – September 26, 1986^{CJ}
Scalia	September 26, 1986 – February 13, 2016
Gorsuch	April 10, 2017 – present

Associate Justice 10
Established April 10, 1869 per Judiciary Act of 1869
Bradley	March 23, 1870 – January 22, 1892
Shiras	October 10, 1892 – February 23, 1903
Day	March 2, 1903 – November 13, 1922
Butler	January 22, 1923 – November 16, 1939
Murphy	February 5, 1940 – July 19, 1949
Clark	August 24, 1949 – June 12, 1967
T. Marshall	October 2, 1967 – October 1, 1991
Thomas	October 23, 1991 – present

== See also ==
- List of justices of the Supreme Court of the United States
- List of justices of the Supreme Court of the United States by court composition
- List of United States Supreme Court justices by time in office
