= Talbot v. Jansen =

William Talbot v. Joost Jansen
- Supreme Court of the United States

Decided August 22, 1795
- Full case name: Talbot v. Jansen
- Citations: 3 U.S. 133 (more) 3 Dall. 133; 1 L. Ed. 540; 1795 U.S. LEXIS 331

Court membership
- Chief Justice John Rutledge Associate Justices James Wilson · William Cushing; John Blair Jr. · James Iredell; William Paterson

Case opinions
- Seriatim: Paterson
- Seriatim: Iredell
- Seriatim: Cushing
- Seriatim: Rutledge
- Wilson took no part in the consideration or decision of the case.

Talbot v. Jansen, 3 U.S. (3 Dall.) 133 (1795), was a case in which the Supreme Court of the United States held that the jurisdiction of the court extended to the seas and that a citizen of the United States could also hold the citizenship of another polity (in the case of Talbot, being a citizen of France). This holding means that multiple citizenship may be held by Americans.

== See also ==
- Multiple citizenship
