= United States v. Peters (1795) =

- Supreme Court of the United States

Argued August 22, 1795
- Full case name: The United States v. Richard Peters, District Judge
- Citations: 3 U.S. 121 (more) 3 Dall. 121; 1 L. Ed. 535; 1795 U.S. LEXIS 330

Holding
- The Supreme Court can compel a federal trial judge to halt proceedings in a case which the Supreme Court feels is lacking sufficient evidence to proceed.

Court membership
- Chief Justice John Rutledge Associate Justices James Wilson · William Cushing; John Blair Jr. · James Iredell; William Paterson

Case opinion
- Majority: Rutledge, joined by unanimous

United States v. Peters, 3 U.S. (3 Dall.) 121 (1795), was a United States Supreme Court case determining that the federal district court has no jurisdiction over a foreign privateer where the intended captured ship was not within the jurisdiction of the court. The Supreme Court may prohibit the district court from proceeding in such a matter. In the decision the court held:

The district court has no jurisdiction of a libel for damages, against a privateer, commissioned by a foreign belligerent power, for the capture of an American vessel as prize—the captured vessel not being within the jurisdiction.

The supreme court will grant a writ of prohibition to a district judge, when he is proceeding in a cause of which the district court has no jurisdiction.

== See also ==
- List of United States Supreme Court cases, volume 3
- Richard Peters (Continental Congress)
