= John Rutledge =

Chief Justice of the United States in 1795

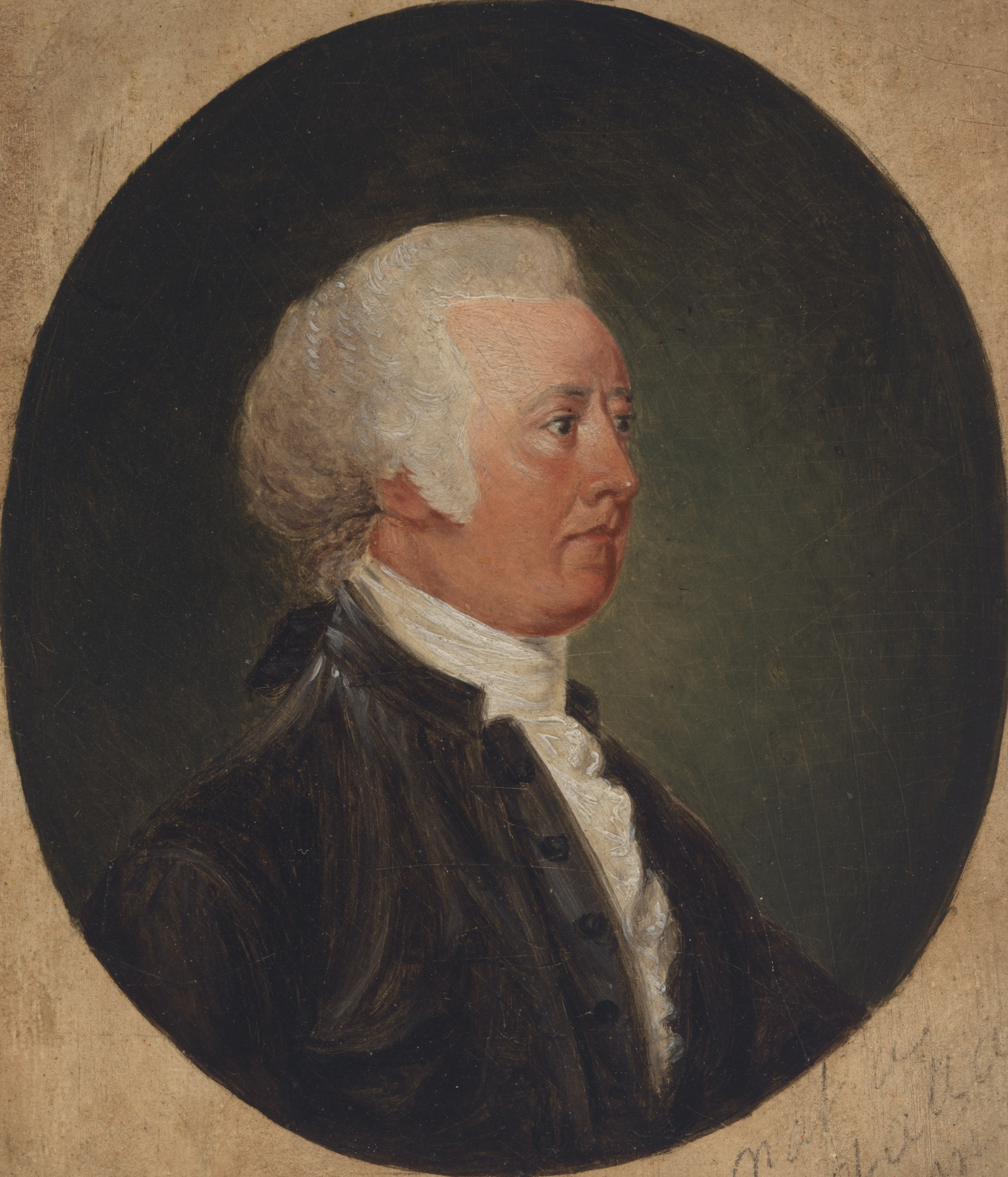
- Portrait by John Trumbull, c. 1791

2nd Chief Justice of the United States
- In office August 12, 1795 – December 28, 1795
- Nominated by: George Washington
- Preceded by: John Jay
- Succeeded by: Oliver Ellsworth

Associate Justice of the Supreme Court of the United States
- In office February 15, 1790 – March 5, 1791
- Nominated by: George Washington
- Preceded by: Position established
- Succeeded by: Thomas Johnson

Chief Justice of the South Carolina Supreme Court
- In office 1791 – 1795

31st Governor of South Carolina (Note: While Rutledge was the 31st Governor of South Carolina, he was the first governor after independence from Great Britain. He was also officially titled the President of South Carolina during his first term.)
- In office January 9, 1779 – January 16, 1782
- Vice President: Henry Laurens; James Parsons
- Lieutenant: Thomas Bee; Christopher Gadsden
- Preceded by: Rawlins Lowndes
- Succeeded by: John Mathews
- In office July 4, 1776 – March 7, 1778 as President of South Carolina
- Preceded by: Henry Laurens (as President of the Committee on Safety)
- Succeeded by: Rawlins Lowndes

Delegate from South Carolina to the Continental Congress
- In office September 5, 1774 – October 26, 1776

Delegate from South Carolina to the Stamp Act Congress
- In office October 7, 1765 – October 25, 1765

Member of the South Carolina Commons House of Assembly
- In office 1761–1775

Attorney General of South Carolina
- In office 1764–1764
- Monarch: George III
- Preceded by: James Moultrie
- Succeeded by: Egerton Leigh

Personal details
- Born: September 17, 1739 Charleston, South Carolina, British America
- Died: June 21, 1800 (aged 60) Charleston, South Carolina, U.S.
- Resting place: St. Michael's Churchyard
- Party: Federalist
- Spouse: Elizabeth Grimké (m. 1763; died 1792)
- Children: 10
- Relatives: Edward Rutledge (brother)
- Education: Middle Temple

John Rutledge Jr. (September 17, 1739 – June 21, 1800) was an American Founding Father, politician, and jurist who served as one of the original associate justices of the Supreme Court and the second chief justice of the United States. Additionally, he served as the first president of South Carolina and later as its first governor after the Declaration of Independence was signed.

Born in Charleston, South Carolina, Rutledge established a legal career after studying at Middle Temple in the City of London. He was the elder brother of Edward Rutledge, a signatory of the Declaration of Independence. Rutledge served as a delegate to the Stamp Act Congress, which protested taxes imposed on the Thirteen Colonies by the Parliament of Great Britain. He also served as a delegate to the Continental Congress, where he signed the Continental Association, before being elected as governor of South Carolina. He served as governor during much of the American Revolutionary War.

After briefly returning to Congress, Rutledge was appointed to the South Carolina Court of Chancery. He was a delegate to the 1787 Philadelphia Convention, which wrote the United States Constitution. During the convention, he served as chairman of the Committee of Detail, which produced the first full draft of the Constitution. The following year he also participated in the South Carolina convention to ratify the Constitution.

In 1789, President George Washington appointed Rutledge as one of the inaugural associate justices of the Supreme Court of the United States. Rutledge left the Supreme Court in 1791 to become chief justice of the South Carolina Court of Common Pleas and Sessions. He returned to the Supreme Court, this time as chief justice, following the resignation of John Jay in June 1795. As the vacancy came during a long Senate recess, Washington named Rutledge as the new chief justice by a recess appointment. When the Senate reconvened in December 1795, it rejected Rutledge's nomination by a 10–14 vote. Rutledge resigned his commission shortly thereafter and withdrew from public life until his death in 1800. He holds the record for the shortest tenure of any chief justice. His was the first Supreme Court nomination to be rejected by the Senate, and he remains the only "recess appointed" justice not to be subsequently confirmed by the Senate.

== Early life and family ==
Self-Described Coat of Arms of John Rutledge

Rutledge was the eldest child in a large family in Charleston, South Carolina. His father was Irish immigrant John Rutledge (Sr.) (1713–1750), a physician. His mother, South Carolina–born Sarah (née Hext; born September 18, 1724), was of English descent. John had six younger siblings: Andrew (1740–1772), Thomas (1741–1783), Sarah (1742–1819), Hugh (1745–1811), Mary (1747–1832), and Edward (1749–1800). John's early education was provided by his father until the latter's death. The rest of Rutledge's primary education was provided by Anglican minister John Andrews and classical scholar David Rhind.

John took an early interest in law and often "played lawyer" with his brothers and sisters. He began to read law under the supervision of his uncle, attorney Andrew Rutledge. Following his uncle's death in 1755, his mother arranged for him to continue his law studies as an apprentice in the law office of James Parsons, with whom he studied for two years. Rutledge then moved to London to further his studies at the Middle Temple. In the course of his studies, he won several cases in English courts. He was called to the bar of England in 1760. After finishing his studies in England, Rutledge returned to Charleston and was admitted to the South Carolina bar in 1761.

Rutledge then began a fruitful legal career. At the time, many new lawyers barely scraped together enough business to earn their livings. Most new lawyers could only hope that they would win well-known cases to ensure their success. Rutledge, however, emerged almost immediately as one of the most prominent lawyers in Charleston, and his services were in high demand.

With his successful legal career, he was able to build on his mother's fortune. On May 1, 1763, Rutledge married Elizabeth Grimké (born 1742). Rutledge was very devoted to his wife, and Elizabeth's death on July 6, 1792, was a major cause of the illness that affected Rutledge in his later years.

John and Elizabeth had 10 children: Martha (1764–1816), Sarah (born and died 1765), John (1766–1819), Edward (1767–1811), Frederick (1769/71–1821/24), William (?–1822), Charles (1773–1821), Thomas (born 1774 and died young), Elizabeth (1776–1842), and States (1783–1829).

== Pre-Revolutionary War ==
From 1761 to 1775, Rutledge served in South Carolina's Commons House of Assembly, becoming one of its leaders.

Rutledge was an important figure in the 1765 Stamp Act Congress. This Congress produced a resolution that stated that it was "the undoubted right of Englishmen, that no taxes be imposed on them but with their own consent, given personally, or by their representatives." Rutledge chaired a committee that drew up a petition to the House of Lords attempting to persuade them to reject the Stamp Act. They were ultimately unsuccessful.

When the delegates returned to South Carolina after the Congress adjourned, they found the state in turmoil. The people had destroyed all the revenue stamps they could find; they broke into the houses of suspected Loyalists to search for stamps. When the Stamp Act went into effect on November 1, 1765, there were no stamps in the entire colony. Dougal Campbell, the Charleston court clerk, refused to issue any papers without the stamps. Because of this, all legal processes in the entire state came to a standstill until news that the Stamp Act had been repealed reached South Carolina in May 1766. After the Stamp Act conflict ended, Rutledge went back into private life and to his law practice. Besides serving in the colonial legislature, he did not involve himself in politics. His law practice continued to expand and he became fairly wealthy as a result.

In 1774, Rutledge was elected to the First Continental Congress. It is not known for certain what John Rutledge did in the Congress; the records of the Congress refer only to "Rutledge", though both John and his brother Edward Rutledge were present. The most important contribution made by "Rutledge" to the Congress was during the debate on how to apportion votes in the Congress. Some wanted votes to be apportioned by the population of the colonies. Others wanted to give each colony one vote. "Rutledge" observed that as the Congress had no legal authority to force the colonies to accept its decisions, it would make the most sense to give each colony one vote. The other delegates ultimately agreed to this proposal.

== President of South Carolina ==
Rutledge served in the First Continental Congress and the Second Continental Congress until 1776. That year, he was elected president of South Carolina under a constitution drawn up on March 26, 1776. Upon taking office, he worked quickly to organize the new government and to prepare defenses against British attack.

In early 1776, Rutledge learned that British forces would attempt to take Charleston. In response, he ordered the construction of Fort Sullivan (now Fort Moultrie) on Sullivan's Island in Charleston Harbor. When the British arrived, the fort was only half completed. General Charles Lee of the Continental Army, who had arrived a few days earlier with reinforcements from North Carolina, told Rutledge the fort should be evacuated, as Lee considered it indefensible. Lee said that the fort would fall in under a half an hour, and all the men would be killed. In a note to the fort's commanding officer, Colonel William Moultrie, Rutledge wrote "General Lee ... wishes you to evacuate the fort. You will not, without [an] order from me. I would sooner cut off my hand than write one." Rutledge noticed that Lee was arrogant, uncouth and unfit to control the militia. Rutledge, by being elected as South Carolina's Governor, gained control of the militia, exercising significant wartime leadership and governance during the American Revolutionary War. Rutledge let it be known that only he could order the militia to defend Charleston. During this time, Rutledge garnered the nickname "Dictator John" by virtue of getting his way with things.

On June 28, 1776, the British attacked the fort, expecting it to fall quickly. However, the fort's walls were made out of palmetto logs packed with sand, so the British cannonballs were absorbed into the soft core of the logs without doing much damage, and the British were repulsed, saving Charleston. The battle anniversary is still celebrated as "Carolina Day", on June 28 each year. South Carolina's current "Palmetto Flag", adopted in 1861, features the crescent symbol on the defending soldiers' caps along with the palmetto tree.

Rutledge continued as president of South Carolina until 1778. That year, the South Carolina legislature proposed a new constitution. Rutledge vetoed it, stating that it moved the state dangerously close to a direct democracy, which Rutledge believed was only a step away from total anarchy. When the legislature overrode his veto, Rutledge resigned.

== Governor of South Carolina ==
A few months after Rutledge's resignation, the British, having suffered several defeats in the North, decided to try to retake the South. Lieutenant-Colonel Archibald Campbell landed in Georgia with 3,000 men and quickly took control of the entire state.

The new South Carolina state constitution was revised, and in 1779 Rutledge was elected governor. While the first governor independent from Great Britain, Rutledge is considered by historians and the government of South Carolina to be the 31st governor, counting from the colonial governors. Rutledge sent troops under General Benjamin Lincoln into Georgia to harass the British. The new British commander in the south, General Jacques Prevost, responded by marching on Charleston with 2,500 troops. When Rutledge heard about this threat, he hurried to Charleston and worked furiously to build up defenses. In spite of Rutledge's efforts, when General Prevost arrived outside Charleston, the British force had been greatly increased by the addition of Loyalists, and the Americans were vastly outnumbered.

Rutledge privately asked Prevost for surrender terms. Prevost made an offer, but when Rutledge submitted it to the council of war, the council instructed Rutledge to ask if the British would accept a declaration of South Carolina's neutrality in the Revolution. They forbade Rutledge from surrendering mainly because General Moultrie believed that the Americans had at least as many troops as the British force, which consisted largely of untrained civilians. Prevost replied that as he was faced with such a large military force, he would have to take some of them prisoner before he could accept. Moultrie advised the council that he would never stand by and allow the British to take Americans prisoner without fighting, so the council decided to fight it out. The city braced itself for an attack, but the next morning, the British had disappeared. Prevost had intercepted a letter from General Lincoln to Moultrie saying that he was marching to the aid of Charleston, and Prevost decided that he could not hold out if the Americans received reinforcements.

=== Charleston occupied ===
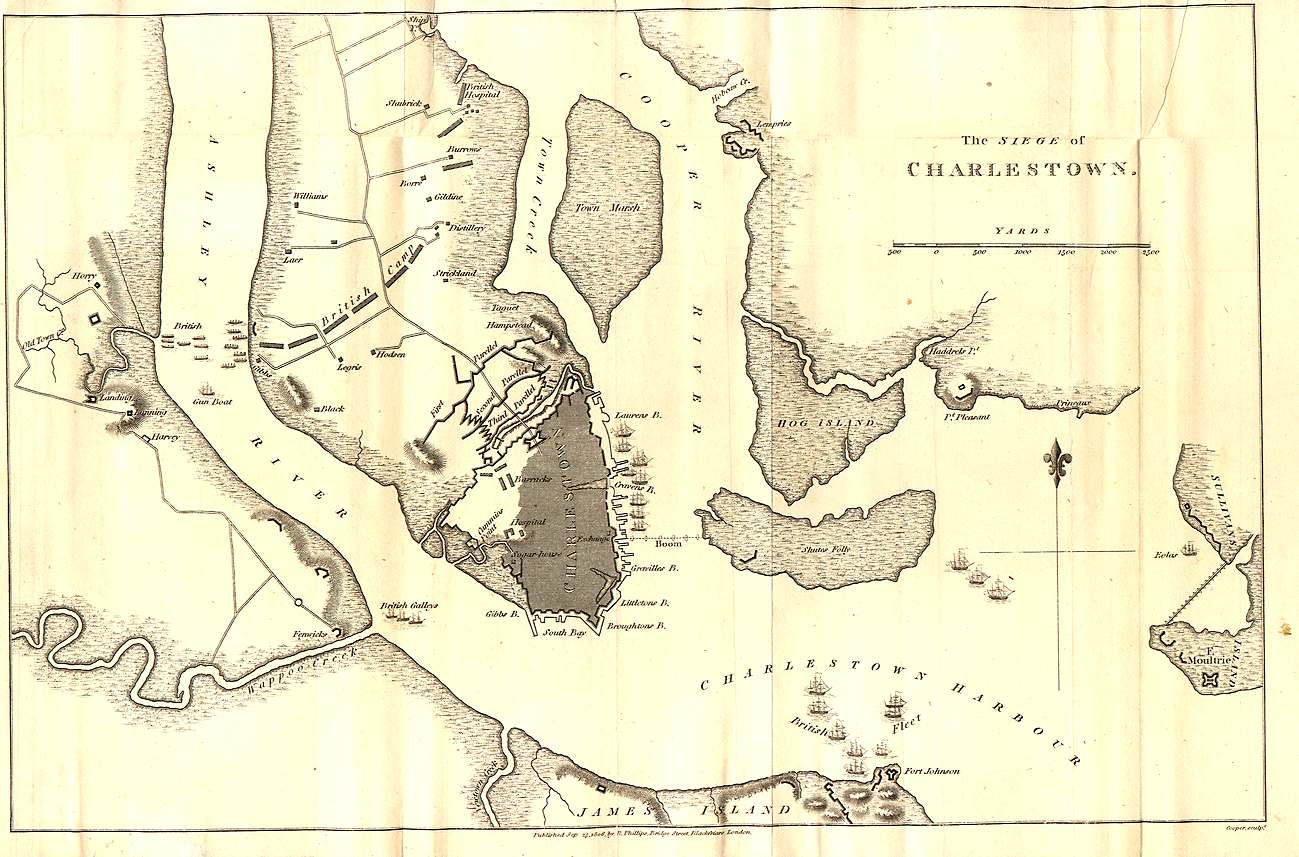
A map showing the battle lines during the British siege in 1780.

In early 1780, Sir Henry Clinton attacked South Carolina, and Charleston was thrown into a panic. The legislature adjourned upon learning of the British. Their last action was to give Rutledge power to do anything short of execution without trial. Rutledge did his best to raise militia forces, but Charleston was in the midst of a smallpox epidemic, and few dared to enter the city. In February, Clinton landed near Charleston with 5,000 troops. By May he had 9,000 troops against less than 2,500 Americans in the area. The siege of Charleston ensued. On May 10, Charleston surrendered. Rutledge had left the city. He remained governor of the unconquered part of South Carolina.

Though the Americans defeated the British at the Battle of Cowpens in January 1781, they could not drive the British back to Charleston until June 1781, when General Nathanael Greene arrived with more troops. The British held Charleston until December 14, 1782. Rutledge's term of office had already ended, and he did not run again because of term limits. A few weeks after leaving the governorship, Rutledge was again elected to the Continental Congress, where he served until 1783. In 1784, he was appointed to the South Carolina Court of Chancery, where he served until 1791.

== Constitutional Convention ==
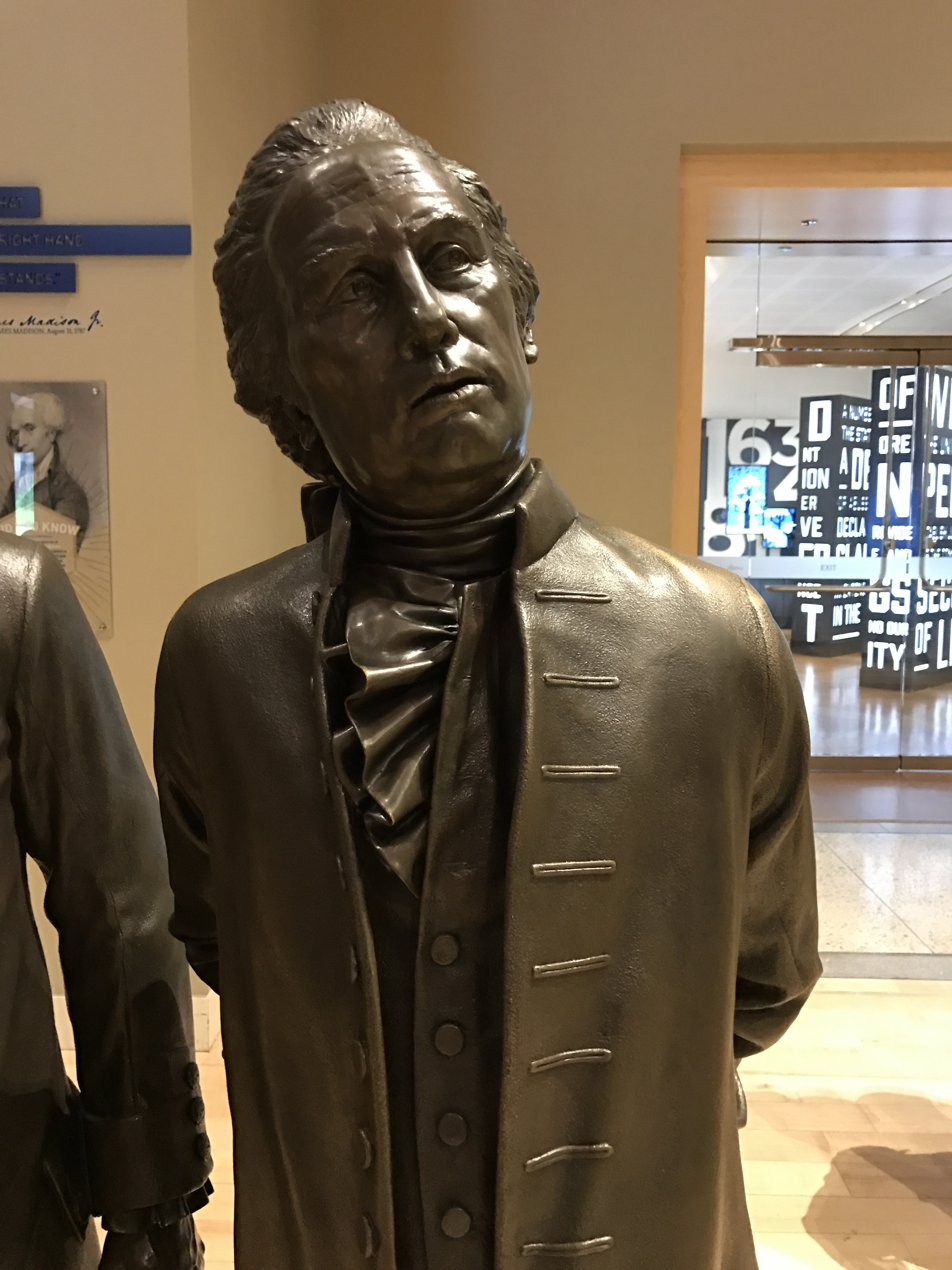
Rutledge's likeness at the National Constitution Center

In 1787, Rutledge was selected to represent South Carolina in the Philadelphia Convention which was called to revise the Articles of Confederation but instead produced the United States Constitution. He attended all the sessions and served on five committees. At the convention, Rutledge maintained a moderate nationalist stance and chaired the Committee of Detail. After the convention had debated the Virginia Plan and settled some major points of controversy, the Committee of Detail assembled during the convention's July 4 recess. Though the committee did not record its minutes, it is known that the committee used the original Virginia Plan, the decisions of the convention on modifications to that plan, and other sources, to produce the first full draft. Much of what was included in this draft consisted of details, such as powers given to Congress, that had not been debated by the convention. Most of them were uncontroversial and unchallenged, and as such, much of what Rutledge's committee included in this first draft made it into the final version of the Constitution without debate.

Rutledge recommended that the executive power should consist of a single person, rather than several, because he felt that one person would feel the responsibility of the office more acutely. Because the president would not be able to defer a decision to another "co-president," Rutledge concluded that a single person would be more likely to make a good choice. Rutledge was largely responsible for denying the Supreme Court the right to give advisory opinions. Being a judge himself, he strongly believed that a judge's sole purpose was to resolve legal conflicts; he held that judges should hand down an opinion only when they rule on an actual case. He also thought that the legal community was the higher tier of society.

Rutledge argued that if either house of the legislature was to have the sole authority to introduce appropriation bills, it should be the Senate. He noted that the Senate, by nature of its lengthier terms of office, would tend to be more leisurely in its actions. That made Rutledge feel that the Senate could better think clearly about what the consequences of a bill would be. Also, since the bills could not become law without the consent of the House of Representatives, he concluded that there would be no danger of the Senate ruling the country.

When the proposal was made that only landowners should have the right to vote, Rutledge opposed it perhaps more strongly than any other motion in the entire convention. He stated that making such a rule would divide the people into "haves" and "have nots," would create an undying resentment against landowners and could do nothing but cause discord. He was supported by Benjamin Franklin, and the rule was not adopted.

In the debate on slavery in the new country, Rutledge took the side of the slaveholders since he was a Southerner and a slaveholder. Rutledge said that if the Constitution forbade slavery, the Southern states would never agree to the Constitution.

He received six electoral votes from South Carolina during the first U.S. presidential election.

== Supreme Court tenure ==
=== Associate Justice ===
On September 24, 1789, George Washington nominated Rutledge for one of the five associate justice positions on the newly established Supreme Court. His appointment (along with those of: John Blair Jr., William Cushing, Robert H. Harrison, and James Wilson; plus that of John Jay for Chief Justice) was confirmed by the Senate two days later. His service on the Court officially began February 15, 1790, when he took the judicial oath, and continued until March 5, 1791. Rutledge resigned from the Supreme Court, without having ever heard a case, in order to become chief justice of the South Carolina Court of Common Pleas and General Sessions.

=== Chief Justice ===
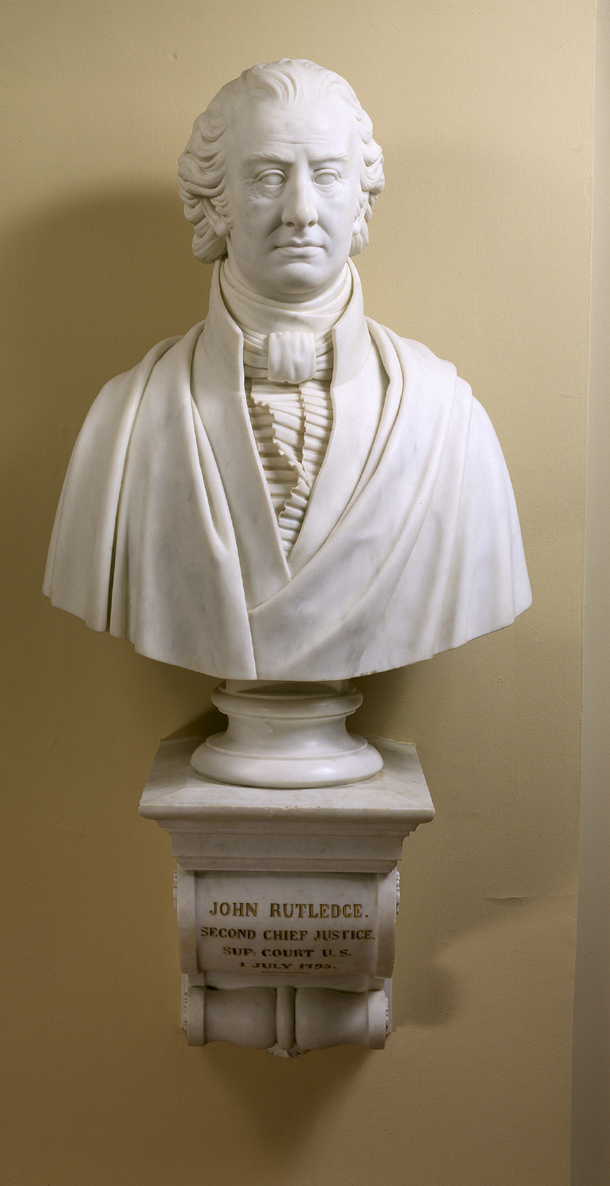
Bust of John Rutledge in the United States Supreme Court

On June 28, 1795, Chief Justice John Jay resigned, having been elected governor of New York. Washington selected Rutledge to succeed Jay as chief justice, and, as the Senate would not be meeting again until December, gave Rutledge a recess appointment so that he could serve as chief justice during the upcoming August session. He was commissioned as chief justice on June 30, 1795, and took the judicial oath on August 12.

War at this time would give a serious wound to our growth and prosperity. Can we escape it for ten or twelve years or more we may then meet it without much inquietude, and may advance and support with energy and effect any just pretensions to greater commercial advantages than we may now enjoy.

— Alexander Hamilton to George Washington, in support of the Jay Treaty, July 9, 1795, Lodge, ed.The Works of Alexander Hamilton 1903 VI 176-77

On July 16, 1795, Rutledge gave a highly controversial speech denouncing the Jay Treaty with Great Britain. He reportedly said in the speech "that he had rather the President should die than sign that puerile instrument"– and that he "preferred war to an adoption of it." Rutledge's speech against the Jay Treaty cost him the support of many in the Washington administration, which supported the treaty, and in the Senate, which would soon be called upon to advise the president on his nomination of Rutledge to the judicial post and to consent to its ratification by a two-thirds vote.

Two cases were decided while Rutledge was chief justice. In United States v. Peters, the Court ruled that federal district courts had no jurisdiction over crimes committed against Americans in international waters. In Talbot v. Jansen, the Court held that a citizen of the United States did not waive all claims to U.S. citizenship by either renouncing citizenship of an individual state or by becoming a citizen of another country. The Rutledge Court thus established an important precedent for multiple citizenship in the United States.

By the time of his formal nomination to the Court on December 10, 1795, Rutledge's reputation was in tatters, and support for his nomination had faded. Rumors of mental illness and alcohol abuse swirled around him, concocted largely by the Federalist press. His words and actions in response to the Jay Treaty were used as evidence of his continued mental decline. The Senate rejected his appointment on December 15, 1795, by a vote of 10–14. Altogether, 9 Democratic-Republicans and 1 Federalist voted in favor of confirmation, while 14 Federalists voted against it; additionally, 5 Federalists and 1 Democratic-Republican did not vote. This was the first time that the Senate had voted down a Supreme Court nomination. As of 2026; it remains the only U.S. Supreme Court recess appointment to be subsequently rejected by the Senate.

Though the Senate remained in session through June 1, 1796, which would have been the automatic end of Rutledge's commission following the rejection, Rutledge resigned from the Court two weeks later, on December 28, 1795. Two days earlier, on December 26, 1795, Rutledge attempted suicide by jumping off a wharf into Charleston Harbor. He was rescued by two slaves who saw him drowning. He served the briefest tenure of any Chief Justice of the United States (138 days).

== Later years ==
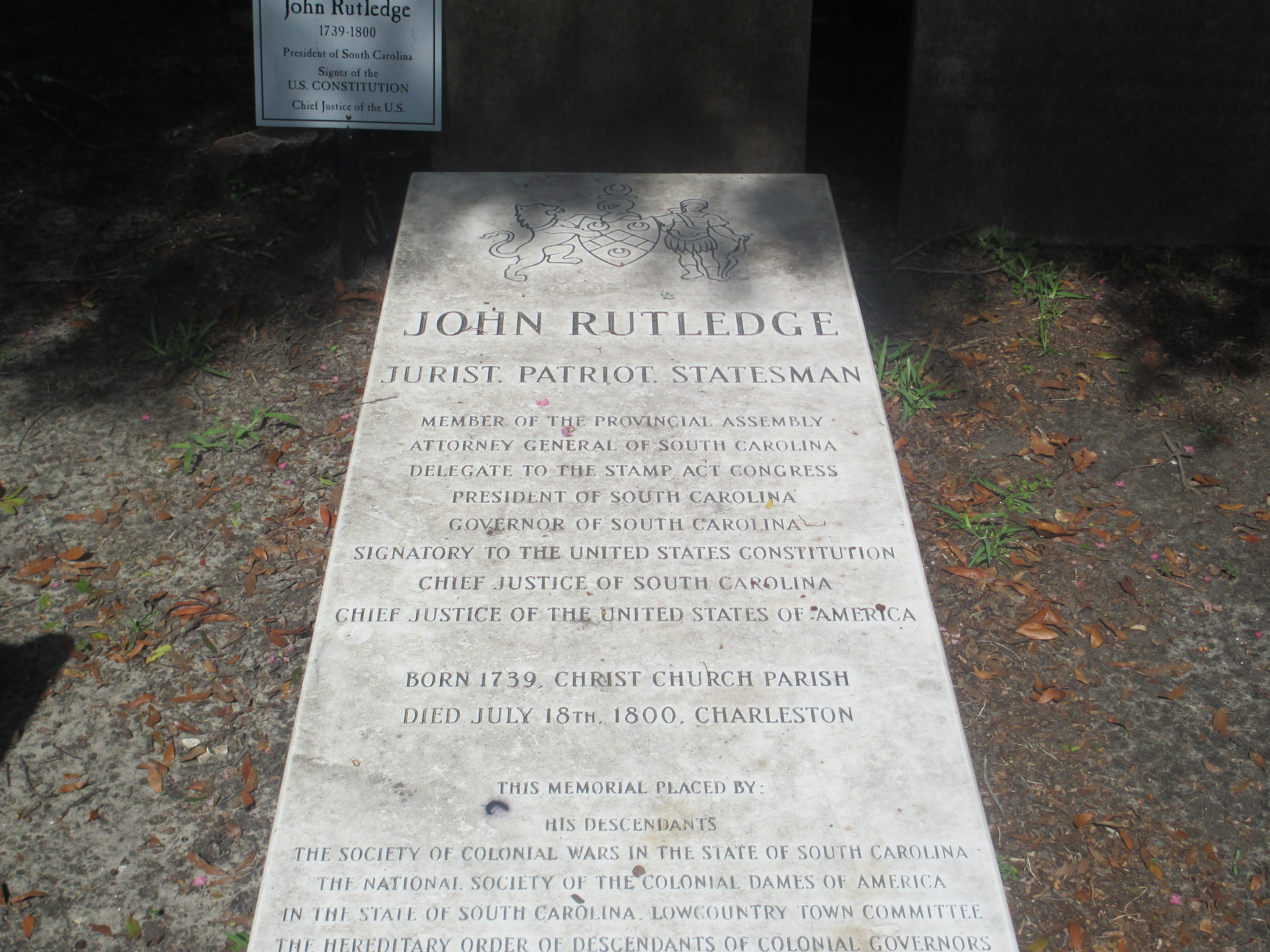
Gravestone of John Rutledge at St. Michael's Episcopal Church in Charleston, South Carolina

After his suicide attempt and resignation from the Supreme Court, Rutledge withdrew from public life and returned to Charleston. He would remain private, outside of serving a single term in the South Carolina House of Representatives. He died on June 21, 1800, at age 60. He was interred at St. Michael's Episcopal Church in Charleston. One of his houses, said to have been built in 1763 and definitely sold in 1790, was renovated in 1989 and opened to the public as the John Rutledge House Inn.

== Views on slavery ==
Like the majority of wealthy men who lived in Southern states at the time, Rutledge held slaves. During the Revolutionary War, Rutledge ordered Continental Army officer Francis Marion to execute all Black people suspected of carrying provisions or gathering intelligence for the British "agreeable to the laws of this State". Rutledge represented South Carolina in the Constitutional Convention in 1787, during which he strongly defended slavery from those at the convention that would try to abolish it. "If the convention thinks that North Carolina, South Carolina and Georgia will ever agree to the plan unless their right to import slaves be untouched, the expectation is in vain. The people of those states will never be such fools as to give up so important an interest."

The compromise between the Northern and Southern states was that the international slave trade would not be prohibited before 1808. See Article 1 Section 9 of the Constitution. Additionally, the Fugitive Slave Clause was added by the South Carolina delegates during the Constitutional Convention to further protect slavery by requiring enslaved people returned to their states of labor. See Article 4 Section 2 of the Constitution.

According to the state library of South Carolina:

Although Rutledge claimed that he disliked slavery, as an attorney he twice defended individuals who abused slaves. Before the American Revolution, Rutledge owned sixty slaves; afterward, he possessed twenty-eight. His wife, Elizabeth Grimke Rutledge, manumitted her own slaves, and the daughters of her first cousin, John Grimke, were the famous abolitionists Sarah and Angelina Grimké. When Rutledge died in 1800, he only owned one slave.

== See also ==
- Judiciary Act of 1789
- List of nominations to the Supreme Court of the United States
- United States Supreme Court cases during the Rutledge Court

== Bibliography ==
- Barry, Richard, (1942) Mr. Rutledge of South Carolina, Salem, N.H.: Ayer, 1993. ISBN 0-8027-8972-2; ISBN 978-0-8027-8972-3.
- Cooper, William J. Jr., and Thomas E. Terrill. "The American South: A History". Rowman & Littlefield Publishers, 2008.
- Flanders, Henry. The Lives and Times of the Chief Justices of the United States Supreme Court. Philadelphia: J. B. Lippincott & Co., 1874 at Google Books.
- Fradin, Dennis Brindell. The Founders: The 39 Stories behind the U.S. Constitution. New York: Walker Publishing Company, Inc., 2005.
- Hartley, Cecil B. Heroes and Patriots of the South. Philadelphia: G. G. Evans, 1860.
- Haw, James. Founding brothers: John and Edward Rutledge of South Carolina, Athens: University of Georgia, 1997. ISBN 0-8203-1859-0; ISBN 978-0-8203-1859-2.
- Horton, Tom. "History's Lost Moments Volume III." Trafford Publishing, 25 Apr. 2012.
- Madison, James. in E. H. Scott: Journal of the Federal Convention. Chicago: Albert, Scott, and Co., 1893.
- Wood, Gordon S. "The Idea of America." Penguin, 12 May 2011

Political offices
New office	President of South Carolina; 1776–1778	Succeeded by Rawlins Lowndes
Preceded by Rawlins Lowndes	Governor of South Carolina; 1779–1782	Succeeded by John Mathews
Legal offices
New seat	Associate Justice of the Supreme Court of the United States; 1789–1791	Succeeded by Thomas Johnson
Preceded by John Jay	Chief Justice of the United States; 1795	Succeeded by Oliver Ellsworth
