= Oliver Ellsworth =

Chief Justice of the United States from 1796 to 1800

- Portrait miniature by John Trumbull, c. 1792

3rd Chief Justice of the United States
- In office March 8, 1796 – December 15, 1800
- Nominated by: George Washington
- Preceded by: John Rutledge
- Succeeded by: John Marshall

United States Senator from Connecticut
- In office March 4, 1789 – March 8, 1796
- Preceded by: Seat established
- Succeeded by: James Hillhouse

Personal details
- Born: April 29, 1745 Windsor, Connecticut, British America
- Died: November 26, 1807 (aged 62) Windsor, Connecticut, U.S.
- Party: Federalist
- Spouse: Abigail Wolcott
- Children: 9, including William and Henry
- Relatives: Henry W. Ellsworth (grandson); Delia Lyman Porter (great-granddaughter)
- Education: Yale College; Princeton University (AB)

Military service
- Allegiance: United Colonies of North America
- Branch/service: Continental Army
- Rank: Lieutenant Colonel
- Unit: 3rd Connecticut Regiment
- Battles/wars: American Revolutionary War

Oliver Ellsworth (April 29, 1745 – November 26, 1807) was a Founding Father of the United States, attorney, jurist, politician, and diplomat. Ellsworth was a framer of the United States Constitution, United States senator from Connecticut, and the third chief justice of the United States. Additionally, he received 11 electoral votes in the 1796 presidential election.

Born in Windsor, Connecticut, Ellsworth attended the College of New Jersey where he helped found the American Whig–Cliosophic Society. In 1777, he became the state attorney for Hartford County, Connecticut, and was selected as a delegate to the Continental Congress, serving during the remainder of the American Revolutionary War. He served as a state judge during the 1780s and was selected as a delegate to the 1787 Philadelphia Convention, which produced the United States Constitution. While at the convention, Ellsworth played a role in fashioning the Connecticut Compromise between the more populous states and the less populous states. He also served on the Committee of Detail, which prepared the first draft of the Constitution, but he left the convention and did not sign the document.

His influence helped ensure that Connecticut ratified the Constitution, and he was elected as one of Connecticut's inaugural pair of senators, serving from 1789 to 1796. He was the chief author of the Judiciary Act of 1789, which shaped the federal judiciary of the United States and established the Supreme Court's power to overturn state supreme court decisions that were contrary to the United States Constitution. Ellsworth served as a key Senate ally to Alexander Hamilton and aligned with the Federalist Party. He led the Senate passage of Hamiltonian proposals such as the Funding Act of 1790 and the Bank Bill of 1791. He also advocated in favor of the United States Bill of Rights and the Jay Treaty.

In 1796, after the Senate rejected the nomination of John Rutledge to serve as Chief Justice, President George Washington nominated Ellsworth to the position. Ellsworth was near-unanimously confirmed by the Senate, and served until 1800, when he resigned due to poor health. Few cases came before the Ellsworth Court, and he is chiefly remembered for his discouragement of the previous practice of seriatim opinion writing. He simultaneously served as an envoy to France from 1799 to 1800, signing the Convention of 1800 to settle the hostilities of the Quasi-War. He was succeeded as chief justice by John Marshall. He subsequently served on the Connecticut Governor's Council until his death in 1807.

== Youth and family life ==
Ellsworth was born in Windsor, Connecticut, to Capt. David and Jemima (née Leavitt) Ellsworth.

Ellsworth's ancestors had lived in Windsor since the middle of the 17th century. Josiah Ellsworth, Oliver's great-grandfather, was born in about 1629 in Cambridgeshire, England. Josiah immigrated to Connecticut in 1646, although it is unclear if he did this on his own, he married a woman born in Massachusetts named Elizabeth Holcombe. Josiah's occupation is listed as "juror". He would pass away in 1689. Ellsworth's maternal grandmother's maternal grandfather (his great-great-grandfather) was Lieutenant Daniel Pond. He was born in England in the 1620s or 1630s. He settled in Dedham, Massachusetts in the early 1650s, where he worked as a carpenter and a long-time selectman to support his growing family. He was in a militia, which is why he has the title of "Lieutenant". He died in 1697 or 1698. Beyond this, Ellsworth's ancestry can also be traced to Edward Heath, a collarmaker who was born in 1525 in Little Amwell, Hertfordshire, England (a settlement near Ware).

Ellsworth entered Yale in 1762, but transferred to the College of New Jersey (later Princeton) at the end of his second year. Along with William Paterson and Luther Martin (both of whom served with him at the Constitutional Convention in 1787) he founded the "Well Meaning Club," which became the Cliosophic Society—now part of Whig-Clio, the nation's oldest college debating club. He received his A.B. degree in 1766, Phi Beta Kappa after 2 years. Soon afterward, Ellsworth turned to the law. After four years of study, he was admitted to the bar in 1771 and later became a successful lawyer and politician.

In 1772, Ellsworth married Abigail Wolcott, the daughter of Abigail Abbot and William Wolcott, nephew of Connecticut colonial governor Roger Wolcott, and granddaughter of Abiah Hawley and William Wolcott of East Windsor, Connecticut.

They had nine children including the twin brothers William Wolcott Ellsworth and Henry Leavitt Ellsworth. William married Noah Webster's daughter, served in Congress and was elected Governor of Connecticut. Henry became the first Commissioner of the United States Patent Office, the mayor of Hartford, president of Aetna Life Insurance and a major benefactor of Yale College. Henry was also instrumental in the creation of the U.S. Agriculture Department and oversaw the forced relocation of Cherokee Indians from Georgia to the Oklahoma Territory. He was a friend and backer of inventors Samuel Colt and Samuel F.B. Morse, and his daughter Annie Ellsworth proposed the first message transmitted by Morse over the telegraph, "What hath God wrought?"

== Revolutionary War ==
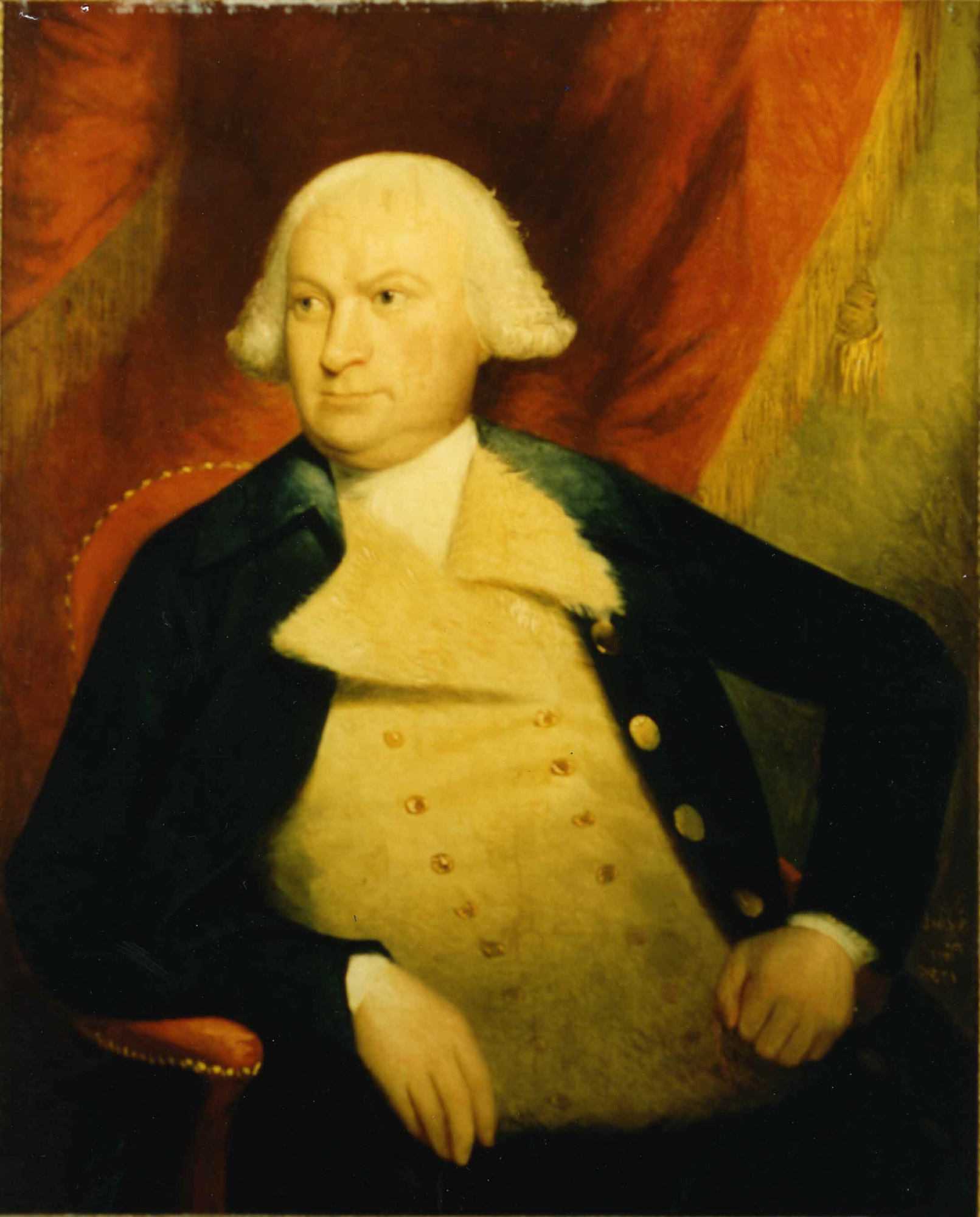
Portrait by Ralph Earl, c. 1785

Commissioned as a captain of the 3rd Connecticut Regiment of the Connecticut militia in 1773, Ellsworth was promoted to Lieutenant Colonel in 1774 and led three regiments of light cavalry supporting the Continental Army in New York during the summer of 1776.

Ellsworth built up a prosperous law practice and in 1777 he became Connecticut's state attorney for Hartford County. That same year, he was chosen as one of Connecticut's representatives in the Continental Congress. He served 1777–80 and 1781–83 on various committees, including the Marine Committee, the Board of Treasury, and the Committee of Appeals. Ellsworth was also active in his state's efforts during the Revolution, having served as a member of the Committee of the Pay Table that supervised Connecticut's war expenditures. In 1777 he joined the Committee of Appeals, which can be described as a forerunner of the Federal Supreme Court. While serving on it, he participated in the Olmstead case that brought state and federal authority into conflict. In 1779, he assumed greater duties as a member of the Council of Safety, which, with the governor, controlled all military measures for the state. His first judicial service was on the Supreme Court of Errors when it was established in 1785, but he soon shifted to the Connecticut Superior Court and spent four years on its bench.

== Constitutional Convention ==
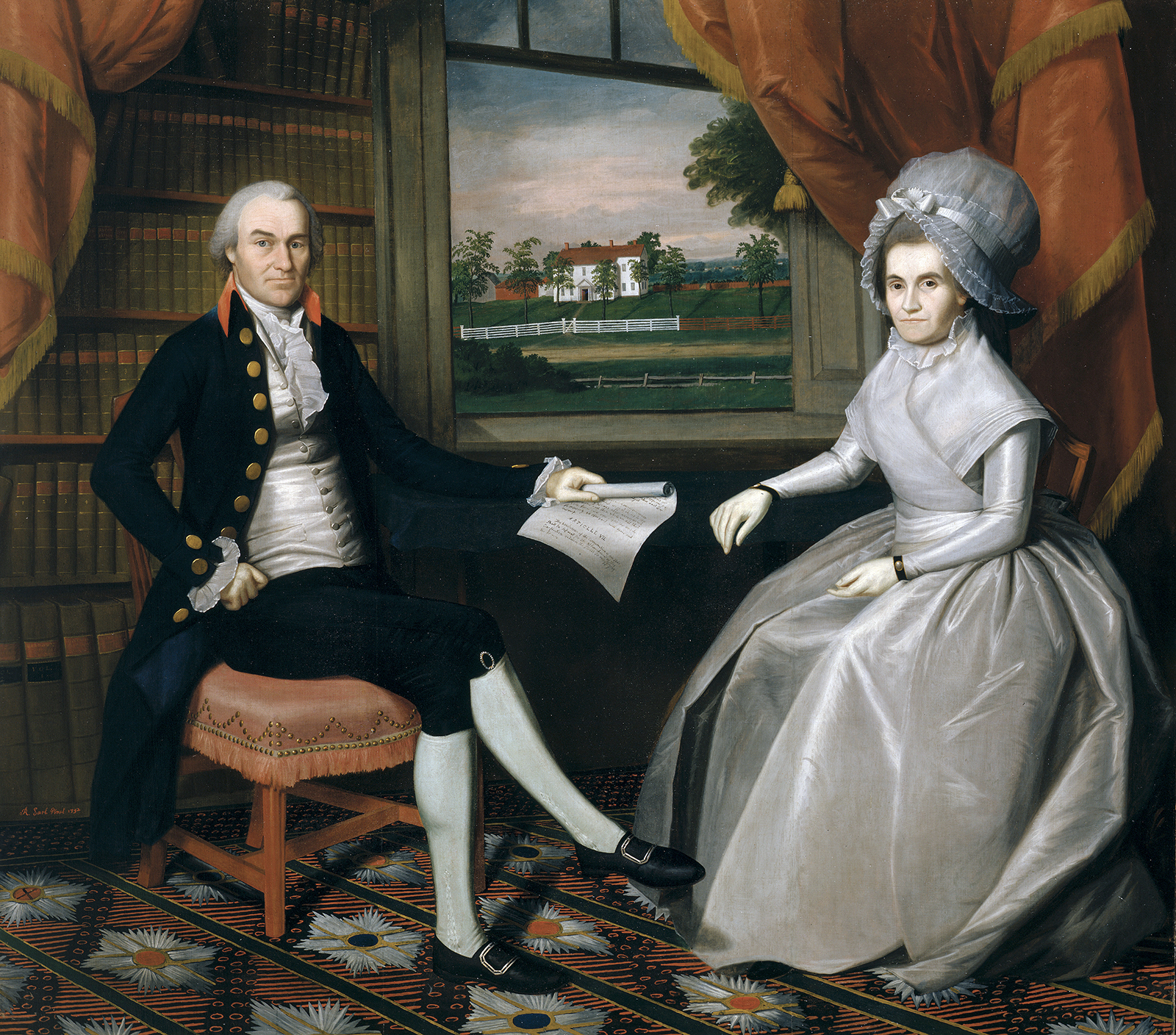
Oliver and Abigail Ellsworth by Ralph Earl

Ellsworth participated in the 1787 Constitutional Convention in Philadelphia as a delegate from Connecticut along with Roger Sherman and William Samuel Johnson. More than half of the 55 delegates were lawyers, eight of whom, including both Ellsworth and Sherman, had previous experience as judges conversant with legal discourse.

Ellsworth took an active part in the proceedings beginning on June 20, when he proposed the use of "the United States" to identify the government under the authority of the Constitution. The words "United States" had already been used in the Declaration of Independence and Articles of Confederation as well as Thomas Paine's The American Crisis. It was Ellsworth's proposal to retain the earlier wording to sustain the emphasis on a federation rather than a single national entity. Three weeks earlier, on May 30, 1787, Edmund Randolph of Virginia had moved to create a "national government" consisting of a supreme legislative, an executive, and a judiciary. Ellsworth accepted Randolph's notion of a threefold division but moved to strike the phrase "national government." Since then, the "United States" has been the official title used in the convention to designate the government. The complete name, "the United States of America," had already been featured by Paine, and its inclusion in the Constitution was the work of Gouverneur Morris when he made the final editorial changes in the Constitution.

Ellsworth played a major role in the adoption of the Connecticut Compromise. The convention was deadlocked over the question of representation in Congress, with the large states wanting proportional representation and the small states demanding equal representation for each state. During the debate, he joined his fellow Connecticut delegate Roger Sherman in proposing the bicameral Congress in which two members of the Senate would be elected by each state legislature, while membership in the House of Representatives would be apportioned among the states based on its share of the whole population of the states. The compromise was adopted by the Convention on July 16, 1787.

On the contentious issue of whether slaves would be counted as part of the population in determining representation of the states in Congress or would instead be considered property and so not be counted, Ellsworth voted for the eventual Three-Fifths Compromise. Later, stressing that he had no slaves, Ellsworth spoke twice before the convention, on August 21 and 22, in favor of slavery being abolished. He also played an important role in keeping the concept of judicial review out of the Constitution.

Along with James Wilson, John Rutledge, Edmund Randolph, and Nathaniel Gorham, Ellsworth served on the Committee of Detail, which prepared the first draft of the Constitution, based on resolutions that had already been passed by the convention. The Convention deliberations were interrupted from July 26 to August 6, 1787, while the committee completed its task.

Though Ellsworth left the Convention near the end of August and did not sign the complete final document, he wrote the Letters of a Landholder to promote its ratification. He also played a dominant role in Connecticut's 1788 ratification convention, when he emphasized that judicial review guaranteed federal sovereignty. It seems more than a coincidence that both he and Wilson served as members of the Committee of Detail without mentioning judicial review in the initial draft of the Constitution but then stressed its central importance at their ratifying conventions just a year preceding its inclusion by Ellsworth in the Judiciary Act of 1789.

== United States Senate ==
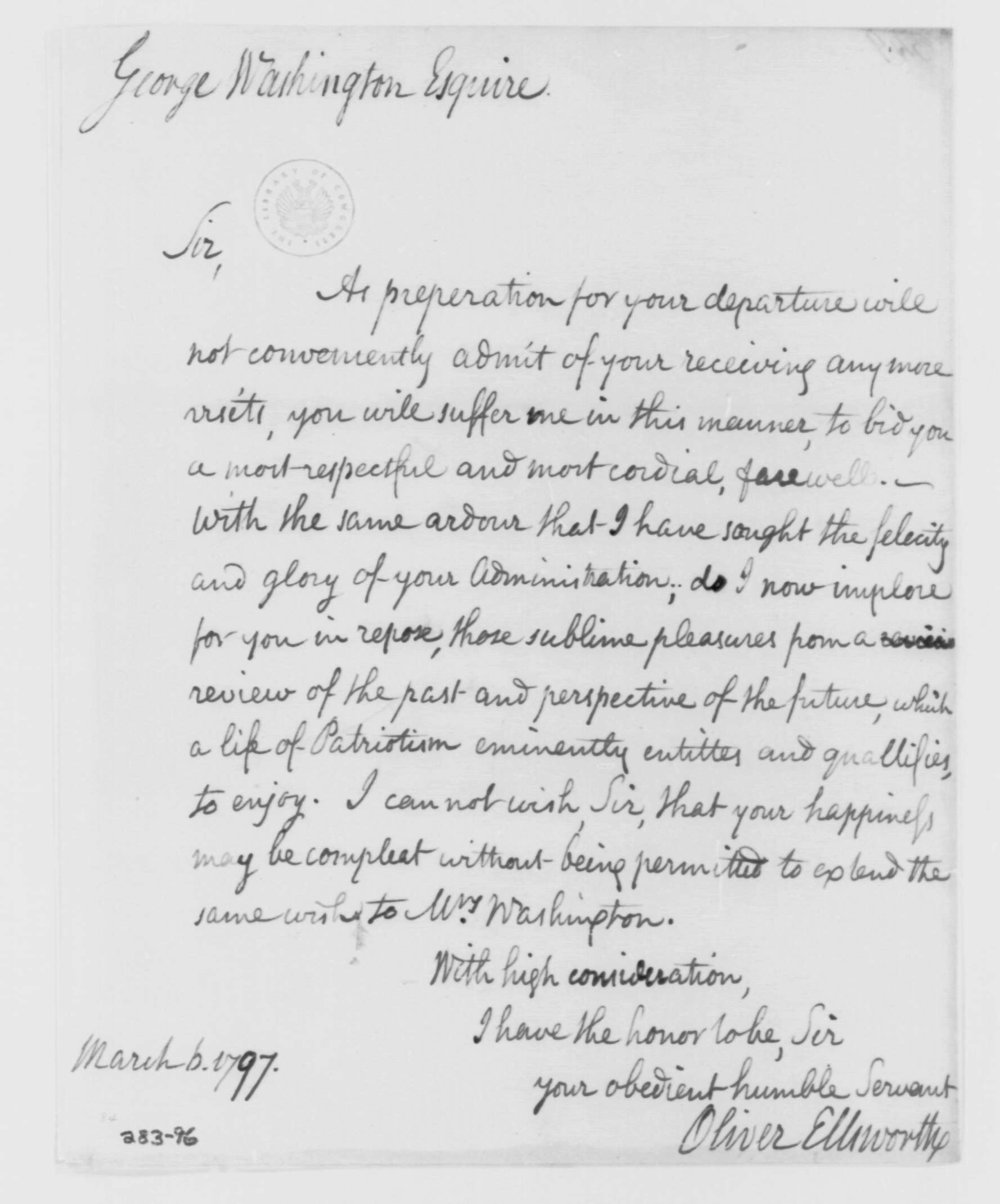
Letter from Ellsworth to George Washington wishing former president "a most respectful and most cordial farewell," March 1797

Along with William Samuel Johnson, Ellsworth served as one of Connecticut's first two United States senators in the new federal government. He identified with the emerging Federalist Party and played a dominant role in Senate proceedings equivalent to that of Senate Majority Leaders in later decades. According to John Adams, he was "the firmest pillar of [Washington's] whole administration in the Senate." [Brown, 231] Aaron Burr complained that if Ellsworth had misspelled the name of the Deity with two D's, "it would have taken the Senate three weeks to expunge the superfluous letter." Senator William Maclay, a Republican Senator from Pennsylvania, offered a more hostile assessment: "He will absolutely say anything, nor can I believe he has a particle of principle in his composition," and "I can in truth pronounce him one of the most candid men I ever knew possessing such abilities." [Brown, 224–225] What seems to have bothered McClay the most was Ellsworth's emphasis on private negotiations and tacit agreement rather than public debate. Significantly, there was no official record of Senate proceedings for the first five years of its existence, nor was there any provision to accommodate spectators. The arrangement was essentially the same as for the 1787 Convention, in contrast to the open sessions of the House of Representatives.

Ellsworth's first project was the Judiciary Act, described as Senate Bill No. 1, which effectively supplemented Article III in the Constitution by establishing a hierarchical arrangement among state and federal courts. Years later Madison stated, "It may be taken for certain that the bill organizing the judicial department originated in his [Ellsworth's] draft, and that it was not materially changed in its passage into law."[Brown, 185] Ellsworth himself probably wrote Section 25, the most important component of the Judiciary Act. This gave the Federal Supreme Court the power to veto state supreme court decisions supportive of state laws in conflict with the U.S. Constitution. All state and local laws accepted by state supreme courts could be appealed to the federal Supreme Court, which was given the authority, if it chose, to deny them for being unconstitutional. State and local laws rejected by state supreme courts could not be appealed in this manner; only the laws accepted by these courts could be appealed. This seemingly modest specification provided the federal government with its only effective authority over state government at the time. In effect, judicial review supplanted Congressional Review, which Madison had unsuccessfully proposed four times at the convention to guarantee federal sovereignty. Granting the federal government this much authority was apparently rejected because its potential misuse could later be used to reject the Constitution at State Ratifying Conventions. Upon the completion of these conventions the previous year, Ellsworth was in the position to render the sovereignty of the federal government defensible, but through judicial review instead of congressional review.

Once the Judiciary Act was adopted by the Senate, Ellsworth sponsored the Senate's acceptance of the Bill of Rights promoted by Madison in the House of Representatives. Significantly, Madison sponsored the Judiciary Act in the House at the same time. Combined, the Judiciary Act and Bill of Rights gave the Constitution the "teeth" that had been missing in the Articles of Confederation. Judicial Review guaranteed the federal government's sovereignty, whereas the Bill of Rights guaranteed the protection of states and citizens from the misuse of this sovereignty by the federal government. The Judiciary Act and Bill of Rights thus counterbalanced each other, each guaranteeing respite from the excesses of the other. However, with the passage of the Fourteenth Amendment in 1865, seventy-five years later, the Bill of Rights could be brought to bear at all levels of government as interpreted by the judiciary with final appeal to the Supreme Court. Needless to say, this had not been the original intention of either Madison or Ellsworth.

Ellsworth was the principal supporter in the Senate of Hamilton's economic program, having served on at least four committees dealing with budgetary issues. These issues included the passage of Hamilton's plan for funding the national debt, the incorporation of the First Bank of the United States, and the bargain whereby state debts were assumed in return for locating the capital to the south (today the District of Columbia). Ellsworth's other achievements included framing the measure that admitted North Carolina to the Union, devising the non-intercourse act that forced Rhode Island to join the union, and drawing up the bill to regulate the consular service. He also played a major role in convincing President Washington to send John Jay to England to negotiate the 1794 Jay Treaty that prevented warfare with England, settled debts between the two nations, and gave American settlers better access to the Midwest.

== Supreme Court and later life ==
=== Ellsworth Court ===
On March 3, 1796, Ellsworth was nominated by President George Washington to be Chief Justice of the United States, the seat having been vacated by John Jay. (Jay's replacement, John Rutledge, had been rejected by the Senate the previous December, and Washington's next nominee, William Cushing, had declined the office in February.). He quickly was confirmed by the United States Senate (21–1), and took the prescribed judicial oath on March 8, 1796.

No major cases came before the Supreme Court during Ellsworth's brief tenure as chief justice. However, four cases the Court issued rulings on were of lasting importance in American jurisprudence: Hylton v. United States (1796) implicitly addressed the Supreme Court's power of judicial review in upholding a federal carriage tax; Hollingsworth v. Virginia (1798) affirmed that the president had no official role in the constitutional amendment process; Calder v. Bull (1798) held that the Constitution's Ex post facto clause applied only to criminal, not civil, cases; and New York v. Connecticut (1799) which was the first use by the Court of its original jurisdiction under Article III of the United States Constitution to hear controversies between two states.

Ellsworth's chief legacy as Chief Justice is his discouragement of the previous practice of seriatim opinion writing, in which each Justice wrote a separate opinion in the case and delivered that opinion from the bench. Ellsworth instead encouraged the consensus of the Court to be represented in a single written opinion, a practice which continues to the present day.

Ellsworth received 11 electoral college votes from three states in the 1796 presidential election. Those votes came at the expense of Thomas Pinckney, who as a result, lost the vice presidency to Thomas Jefferson.

Ellsworth is perhaps most notable for administering the oath of office to John Adams during his presidential inauguration on March 4, 1797.

President Adams appointed Ellsworth United States Envoy Extraordinary to the Court of France in 1799, and tasked with settling differences with Napoleon's government regarding restrictions on U.S. shipping that might otherwise have led to military conflict between the two nations. The agreement accepted by Ellsworth provoked indignation among Americans for being too generous to Napoleon. Moreover, Ellsworth came down with a severe illness resulting from his travel across the Atlantic, prompting him to resign from the Court in late 1800, while still in Europe. He resigned after just four years due to his "constant, and at times excruciating pains," sufferings made worse by his Europe travels, as special envoy to France.

=== Later life and death ===
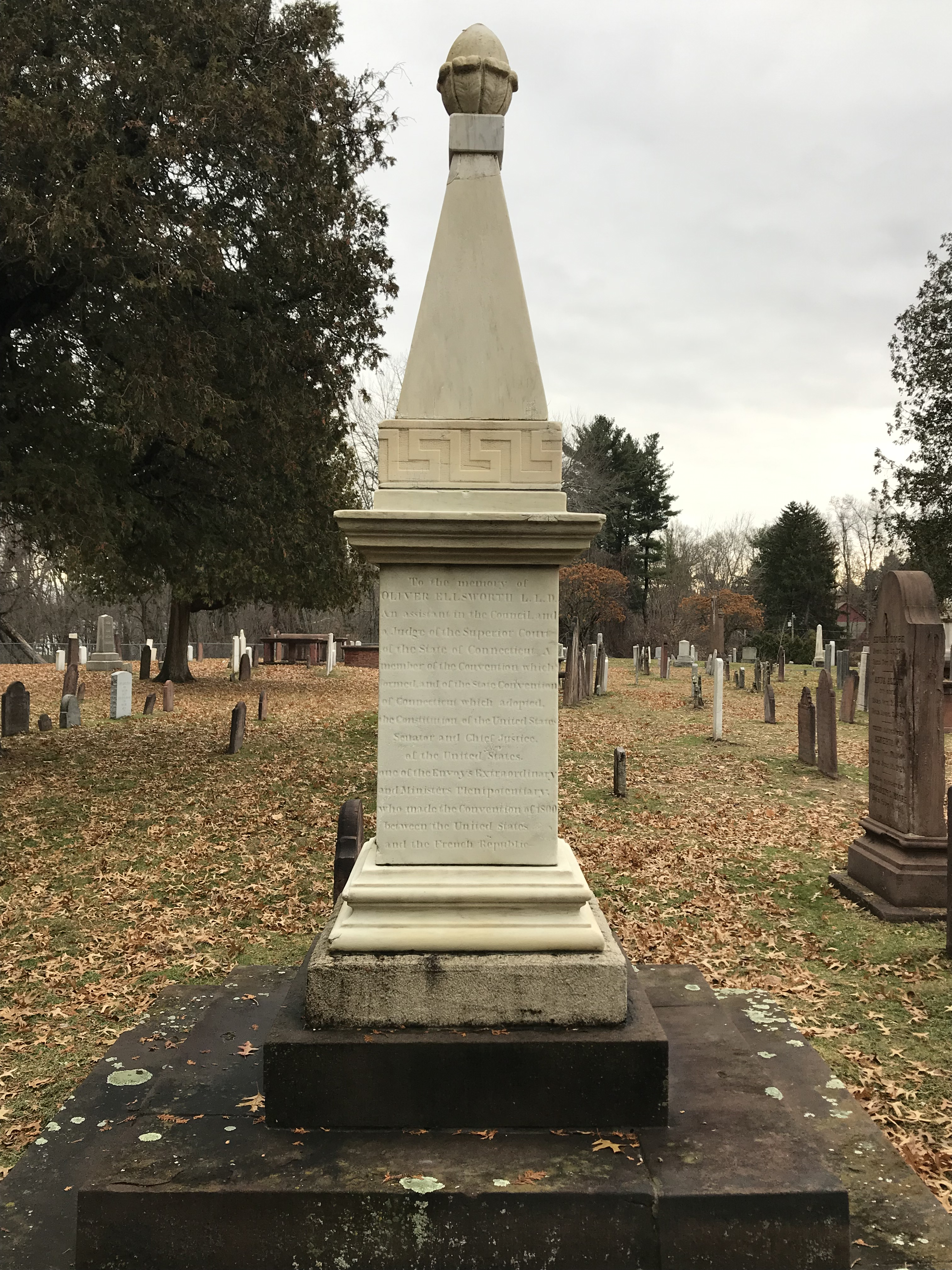
Ellsworth's gravesite

Though he retired from national public life upon his return to America in early 1801, he did remain somewhat active in state politics. He later served once more on the Connecticut Governor's Council, which he was on until his death. He was elected a Fellow of the American Academy of Arts and Sciences in 1803.

Ellsworth died at his home in Windsor on November 26, 1807, at the age of 62. He is buried at the Palisado Cemetery, behind the First Church of Windsor.

Although the cause and manner of his death is largely unspecified, it is believed that his trips crossing the Atlantic Ocean damaged his health and that he never fully recovered, ultimately leading to his death in 1807.

== Legacy ==
In 1847, John Calhoun praised Ellsworth as the first of three Founding Fathers (with Roger Sherman and William Paterson) who gave the United States "the best government instead of the worst and most intolerable on the earth."

In 1800, Ellsworth, Maine, was named in his honor.

John F. Kennedy authored the Encyclopædia Britannica's article on Ellsworth. This was Kennedy's only contribution to the Encyclopedia.

== See also ==
- Demographics of the Supreme Court of the United States
- List of justices of the Supreme Court of the United States
- List of United States chief justices by time in office
- List of United States Supreme Court justices by time in office
- United States Supreme Court cases during the Ellsworth Court

== Books cited ==
- The Life of Oliver Ellsworth, William Garrott Brown, 1905 – repr. by Da Capo Press, 1970
- The Supreme Court in the Early Republic: The Chief Justiceships of John Jay and Oliver Ellsworth, William R. Casto, University of South Carolina Press, 1995
- Oliver Ellsworth and the Creation of the Federal Republic, William R. Casto, Second Circuit Committee on History and Commemorative Events, 1997
- The Records of the Federal Convention of 1787, ed. by Max Farrand, 4 vols., Yale University Press, 1911, 1966
- James Madison's Notes of Debates in the Federal Convention of 1787, James Brown Scott, Oxford University Press, 1918
- The United States of America: A study in International Organization, James Brown Scott, Oxford University Press, 1920.
- 1787 Constitutional Convention: The First Senate of the United States 1789–1795, Richard Streb, Bronx Historical Society, 1996
- Connecticut Families of the Revolution, American Forebears from Burr to Wolcott, Mark Allen Baker, The History Press, 2014

U.S. Senate
Preceded by New seat	U.S. senator (Class 1) from Connecticut; 1789–1796; Served alongside: William Johnson, Roger Sherman, Stephen Mitchell, Jonathan Trumbull	Succeeded by James Hillhouse
Legal offices
Preceded by John Rutledge	Chief Justice of the Supreme Court; 1796–1800	Succeeded by John Marshall
