= John Blair Jr. =

US Supreme Court justice from 1790 to 1795

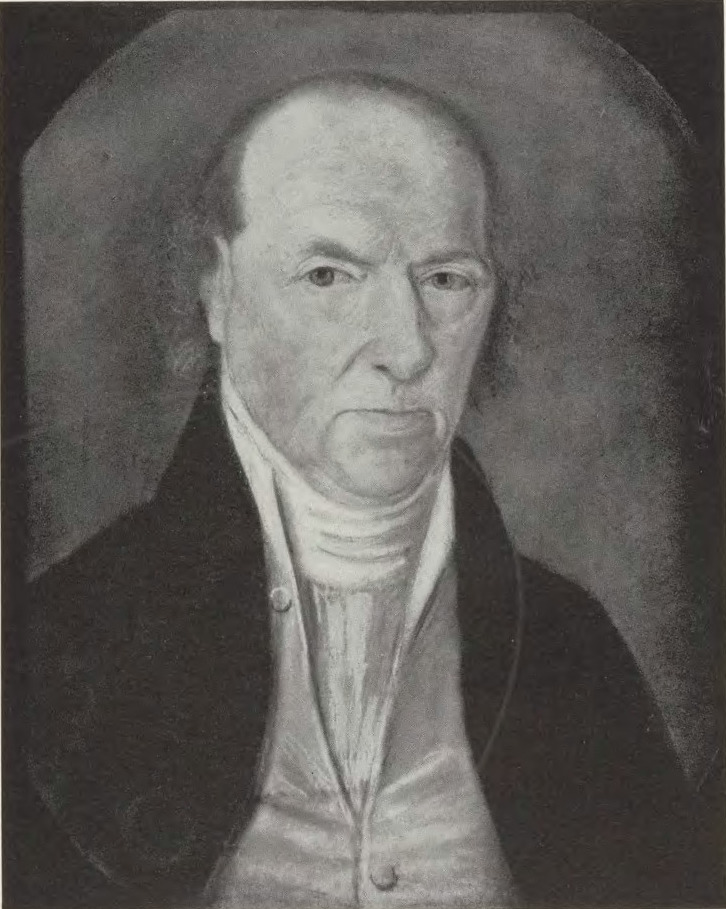

Associate Justice of the Supreme Court of the United States
- In office February 2, 1790 – October 25, 1795
- Nominated by: George Washington
- Preceded by: Seat established
- Succeeded by: Samuel Chase

Member of the General Court and High Court of Chancery for Virginia
- In office 1777-1785

Member of the House of Burgesses from College of William and Mary, Colony of Virginia
- In office 1766-1770
- Preceded by: Mann Page
- Succeeded by: John Page

Personal details
- Born: April 17, 1732 Williamsburg, Virginia, British America
- Died: August 31, 1800 (aged 68) Williamsburg, Virginia, U.S.
- Party: Federalist
- Parent: John Blair Sr. (father)
- Education: College of William & Mary (BA); Middle Temple

John Blair Jr. (April 17, 1732 – August 31, 1800) was an American Founding Father, who signed the United States Constitution as a delegate from Virginia and was appointed an Associate Justice on the first U.S. Supreme Court by George Washington.

A Virginia lawyer since 1757, Blair represented the College of William and Mary in the House of Burgesses (while his father served on the Governor's Council) and served in various colonial offices after giving up his local law practice. In the prelude to the American Revolutionary War, Blair had served as a commissioner of admiralty to enforce regulations promulgated by the Virginia Revolutionary Conventions, then on the committee that prepared the Virginia Declaration of Rights and the Virginia Constitution of 1776. He served for over a year on the Council of State before being appointed as one of the judges of the General Court, the new Commonwealth's first appellate court. He also served on the High Court of Chancery, which was a predecessor of the Virginia Court of Appeals (now the Virginia Supreme Court). Blair was one of the best-trained jurists of his day. A widely respected legal scholar, he avoided the tumult of state politics, preferring to work behind the scenes. He was devoted to the idea of a permanent union of the newly independent states and was a loyal supporter of fellow Virginians James Madison and at the Constitutional Convention. While serving on the Supreme Court, he influenced the interpretation of the Constitution in a number of important decisions. Contemporaries praised Blair for his ability to penetrate to the heart of legal questions, as well as his gentleness and benevolence.

== Early life and education ==
John Blair was born in Williamsburg, Colony of Virginia, in 1732, to Mary (Monro) (1708–1768) and her merchant and politician husband, John Blair. They had a large family, with ten or twelve children by various accounts, and John was the fourth child, and the eldest surviving son. His father served for decades in both houses of the colony's legislature—as a member of the House of Burgesses before decades on the Virginia Governor's Council and (on four occasions) as acting royal governor. His emigrant paternal grandfather, Dr. Archibald Blair, had also served as a burgess, and his brother (this man's great-uncle), Rev. James Blair, had founded and become the first president of the College of William & Mary, and at his death bequeathed much of his estate to this man's father. His maternal grandfather was Rev. John Monro of St. John's Parish, King William County.

As had his father, Blair attended William & Mary, receiving a Bachelor of Arts in 1754. In 1755, he went to London to study law at the Middle Temple.

== Career ==
Returning home to practice law, Blair was admitted to the Virginia bar in 1757 and quickly thrust into public life. He began his public career shortly after the close of the French and Indian War with his election to the seat reserved for the College of William and Mary in the House of Burgesses (1766–1799). He went on to become clerk of the Governor's Council, the upper house of the colonial legislature (1770–1780).

Blair originally joined the moderate wing of the Patriot cause. He opposed Patrick Henry's extremist resolutions in protest of the Stamp Act, but the dissolution of the House of Burgesses by Parliament profoundly altered his views. In response to a series of taxes on the colonies passed by Parliament, Blair joined George Washington and others in 1770 and again in 1774 to draft nonimportation agreements which pledged their supporters to cease importing British goods until the taxes were repealed. In 1775, he reacted to the British Parliament's passage of the Intolerable Acts by joining those calling for a Continental Congress and pledging support for the people of Boston who were suffering economic hardship because of Parliament's actions.

When the American Revolution began, Blair became deeply involved in the government of his state. He served as a member of the convention that drew up Virginia's constitution (1776) and held a number of important committee positions, including a seat on the Committee of 28 that framed the Virginia Declaration of Rights and plan of government. He served on the Privy Council, Governor Patrick Henry's major advisory group (1776–1778). The legislature elected him to a judgeship in the general court in 1778 and soon to the post of chief justice. He was also elected to Virginia's high court of chancery (1780). The judicial appointments automatically made Blair a member of Virginia's first court of appeals. On the Virginia Court of Appeals, Blair participated in Commonwealth of Virginia v. Caton (1782), which set the precedent that courts can deem legislative acts unconstitutional. The decision was a precursor to the United States Supreme Court in decision Marbury v. Madison.

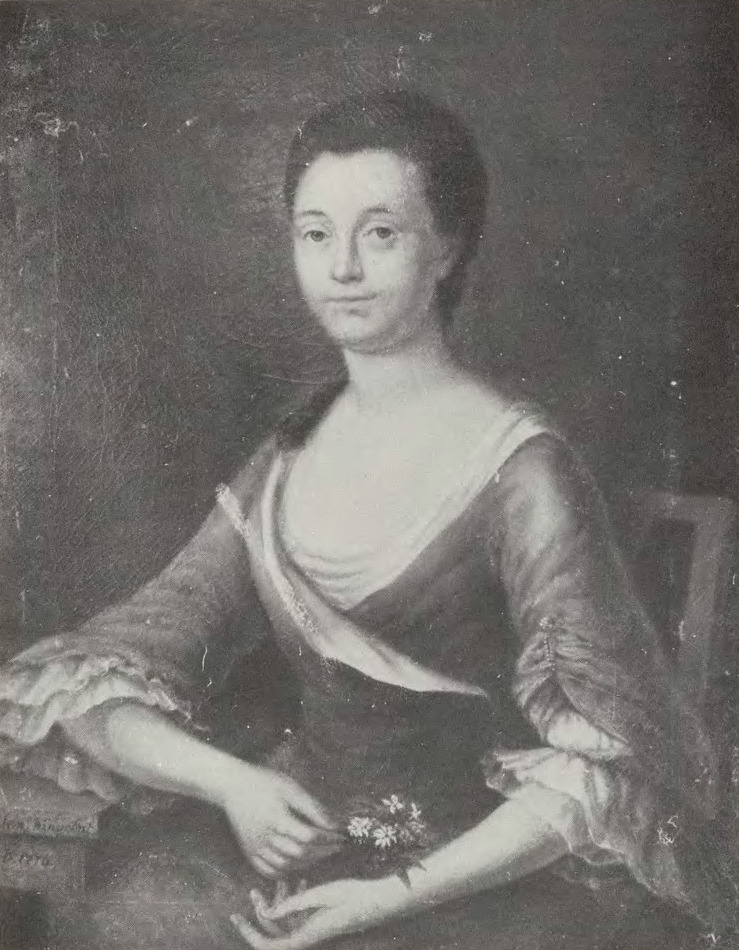
Jean Balfour Blair (1736–1792)

In 1786, the legislature, recognizing Blair's prestige as a jurist, appointed him Thomas Jefferson's successor on a committee revising the laws of Virginia. The following year, he was appointed as a delegate to the Constitutional Convention.

On September 24, 1789, President George Washington nominated Blair for one of the five associate justice positions on the newly established U.S. Supreme Court. He was confirmed by the United States Senate two days later. Blair served on the Supreme Court from February 2, 1790, until October 25, 1795. The court's caseload during Blair's tenure was light, with only 13 cases decided over six years. However, Blair participated in the court's landmark case of Chisholm v. Georgia, which is considered the first United States Supreme Court case of significance and impact.

== Freemasonry ==
Blair was a very active Freemason, and a Past Master of Williamsburg Lodge, involved in the formation of the first Grand Lodge of Virginia. The convention which was called to form the Grand Lodge was petitioned for by Williamsburg Lodge, and following their first meeting in 1777, Blair was elected the very first Grand Master of Freemasons in Virginia on October 13, 1778, in Williamsburg.

== Personal life ==
He married his cousin, Jean Balfour Blair.

== Death and legacy ==
Blair died in Williamsburg on August 31, 1800. He was buried at the Bruton Parish Churchyard in Williamsburg.

Blair Street in Philadelphia, Pennsylvania, is named in his honor, as is Blair Street in Madison, Wisconsin.

== See also ==
- List of justices of the Supreme Court of the United States
- Jay Court

Legal offices
New seat	Associate Justice of the Supreme Court of the United States; 1789–1795	Succeeded by Samuel Chase
