= 1792 New York gubernatorial election =

- April 1792
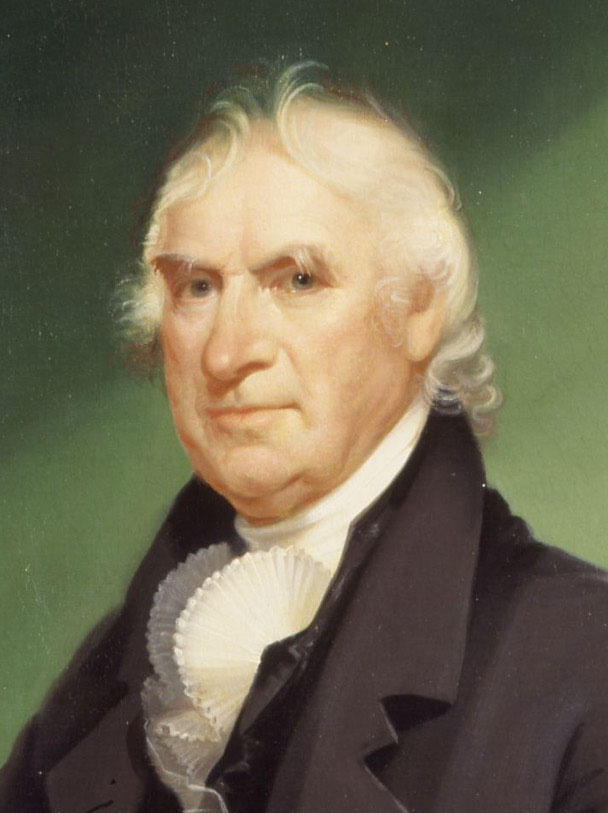

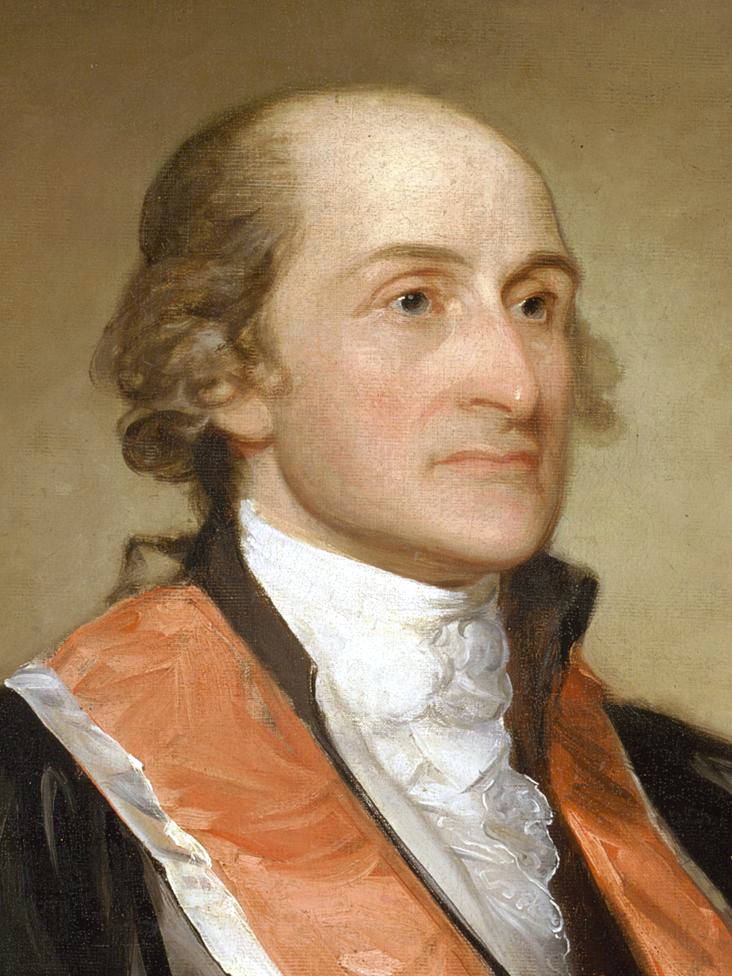
Nominee	George Clinton	John Jay
Party	Democratic-Republican	Federalist
Popular vote	8,440	8,332
Percentage	50.32%	49.68%
- County results Clinton: 50–60% 60–70% 70–80% 80–90% >90% Jay: 50–60% 60–70% 70–80% Returns rejected
Governor before election
George Clinton
Democratic-Republican
Elected Governor
George Clinton
Democratic-Republican

The 1792 New York gubernatorial election was held in April 1792 to elect the Governor and Lieutenant Governor of New York. Incumbent governor George Clinton was narrowly re-elected to a sixth term in office over John Jay, after the votes of Clinton, Ostego, and Tioga counties were disqualified on technicalities.

== Background ==
From the establishment of an independent government of New York in 1777, George Clinton had continuously served in the office of Governor; he had no opponent in 1780 or 1786. During the Clinton administration, New York politics had been divided into two factions, reflecting growing divisions at the national level: a Federalist faction led by Alexander Hamilton and John Jay and a Republican faction led by Governor Clinton.

In January 1791, Aaron Burr, a moderate Republican, was elected to the United States Senate over Federalist incumbent Philip Schuyler. Burr's victory was a sign of growing opposition to the Hamilton faction; Schuyler was Hamilton's father-in-law and at the time, Hamilton's controversial proposals for a national bank and federal assumption of state debts was before Congress. At the April 1791 elections, Republicans made gains in the legislature, including in the Federalist stronghold of New York City.

One political controversy arising during Clinton's fifth term was the sale of approximately 5.5 million acres of public lands, which Clinton referred to as "waste and unappropriated," for a return of $1,030,433. An acrimonious debate in the legislature included accusations that Clinton and his allies personally benefited from the sales, in particular the sale of the majority of the land (3,635,200 acres) to Alexander MacComb Sr., a land speculator from New York City. MacComb purchased the land for eight pence per acre, payable in five installments without interest. Ultimately, the land sale met the legislature's approval.

=== Qualifications ===
Under Article VII of the New York Constitution of 1777, only certain male freeholders and certain freemen of Albany or New York City could vote:

VII. That every male inhabitant of full age, who shall have personally resided within one of the counties of this State for six months immediately preceding the day of election, shall, at such election, be entitled to vote for representatives of the said county in assembly; if, during the time aforesaid, he shall have been a freeholder, possessing a freehold of the value of twenty pounds, within the said county, or have rented a tenement therein of the yearly value of forty shillings, and been rated and actually paid taxes to this State: Provided always, That every person who now is a freeman of the city of Albany, or who was made a freeman of the city of New York on or before the fourteenth day of October, in the year of our Lord one thousand seven hundred and seventy-five, and shall be actually and usually resident in the said cities, respectively, shall be entitled to vote for representatives in assembly within his said place of residence.

== Federalist nomination ==
=== Candidates ===
- John Jay, Chief Justice of the United States and former United States Secretary of State

==== Declined ====
- Robert R. Livingston, Chancellor of New York and former United States Secretary of Foreign Affairs
- Stephen Van Rensselaer, State Senator from Albany
- Robert Yates, Chief Justice of the New York Supreme Court and nominee for Governor in 1789

=== Nomination ===
After leading candidates declined to be considered, the Federalist Party nominated John Jay at a meeting in New York City on February 13. Chief Justice Robert Yates, an anti-federalist who had received cross-faction support to run against Clinton in 1789, attended and expressed his support for the Federalist ticket.

== Republican nomination ==
=== Candidates ===
- George Clinton, incumbent Governor of New York since 1777

=== Nomination ===
A Republican meeting was held in New York City on February 15, at which Governor Clinton was re-nominated for a sixth term.

== General election ==
=== Candidates ===
- George Clinton, incumbent Governor of New York since 1777
- John Jay, Chief Justice of the United States and former United States Secretary of State

==== Declined ====
- Aaron Burr, United States Senator since 1791

Aaron Burr, who had been elected to the United States Senate the prior year, declined to stage a third-party bid despite urging from independents on the ground that he "did not belong to either party." He publicly announced that he would not be a candidate on March 15.

=== Campaign ===
The 1792 campaign was marred by negative campaigning; Federalists attacked Clinton for his system of state patronage and his conduct in the MacComb land grant scandal. Clinton supporters responded that Jay was the captive of New York aristocracy and would subvert the principles of republican government.

=== Results ===
Under state law, a joint committee of the two houses of the New York Legislature was responsible for canvassing the vote, consisting of six Assemblymen and the four members of the New York Senate. At the time of the 1792 election, the committee consisted of David Gelston, Thomas Tillotson, Melancton Smith, Daniel Graham, Pierre Van Cortlandt, Jr., David McCarty, Jonathan N. Havens, Samuel Jones, Isaac Roosevelt, Leonard Gansevoort and Joshua Sands.

The joint committee failed to agree on certification of the votes of Clinton, Ostego, and Tioga counties, disagreeing on whether the ballots cast had been delivered to the Secretary of State "by the sheriff or his deputy":

- The ballots from Otsego County were forwarded to the secretary of state by Sheriff Smith, who was holding over in office until the appointment of a successor after his term had expired.
- The ballot box from Clinton County was delivered to the secretary of state's office by a person who had received the box from the sheriff without a written deputation.
- The ballot box from Tioga County was delivered to the secretary of state by the clerk of the special deputy appointed by the sheriff.

The question was referred to United States Senators Rufus King and Aaron Burr for arbitration. King, a Federalist, said all votes ought to be canvassed, while Burr said that only the ballots from Clinton County ought to be allowed. In Otsego, Jay had a majority of about four hundred and, if the votes in all three counties were counted, would have won the election notwithstanding the small majorities for Clinton in Tioga and Clinton.

Instead, a majority of the canvass committee (Gelston, Tillotson, Smith, Graham, Van Cortlandt, McCarty, Havens) decided to reject the ballots from all three counties and declared George Clinton duly elected governor by a majority of 108 votes. The minority (Jones, Roosevelt, Gansevoort, Sands) protested in writing. Jones, a Republican, crossed party lines to join the Federalist minority.

1792 New York gubernatorial election
Party	Candidate	Votes	%
Democratic-Republican	George Clinton (incumbent)	8,440	50.32%
Federalist	John Jay	8,332	49.68%
Total votes		16,772	100%

== Aftermath ==
The 1792 election was significant in the development of political parties in New York; violent recriminations stemming from the contested result hardened the partisan feeling between Federalists and Republicans, alongside a growing divide in the parties' reactions to the French Revolution.

Governor Clinton was accused of usurpation and the canvass committee of having made a partisan decision against the wishes of the electorate. Chief Justice Jay, who was holding court in Vermont, returned to the state to public displays of support. On his arrival in New York City, a public meeting was called to express opposition to the canvassing committee's decision, which had been made "in contempt of the sacred voice of the people, in defiance of the Constitution, and in violation of the uniform practice and settled principles of law."

At the opening of the next legislature on November 6, Federalists raised the canvassing question by challenging the election of John Livingston to the Senate. The question was decided on strict party lines in favor of the Republicans, 12–11.

On November 13, eighty men claiming to be deputies appeared before the Assembly to "solicit a legislative remedy for the late outrage said to have been committed on the right of suffrage by a majority of the Canvassing Committee." The Assembly voted to approve the canvass. To counter the charge that they had subverted the election, Republicans brought articles of impeachment against William Cooper, an Ostego County judge accused of encouraging illegal voting for Jay and other misconduct. Although a grand jury had already dismissed similar charges, the Assembly investigation proceeded; it revealed no evidence and the charges were dropped. When Federalists regained the legislature in 1794, the charges were dismissed entirely as "frivolous and vexatious."

== See also ==
- New York gubernatorial elections
- New York state elections
- Contested elections in American history
