= Abigail (slave) =

African American slave of John Jay (died 1783)

- Died: December 1783; Paris, France
- Known for: Enslaved by John Jay; death following an attempted escape

Abigail (died December 1783), called Abby, was an African American woman enslaved by the American statesman John Jay. She died after attempting to escape in 1783 in Paris, where Jay helped negotiate the Treaty of Paris to secure America's independence.

The Jay household enslaved Abigail since at least 1776; she was one of at least 17 people Jay enslaved. In 1779, she was the only enslaved person Jay and his family took on their trip to Paris. When Jay left for London in 1783, his family and Abigail remained in Paris. His wife Sarah regularly wrote to him about the household's affairs, and it is from this correspondence that almost all that is known about Abigail is drawn.

While Sarah's letters initially praised "Abbe"'s "attention & proofs of fidelity" and her "usefulness", she was isolated in Paris, with few friends or opportunities to make any, and separated from her loved ones in America. In the summer of 1783, she suffered from toothache and rheumatism. By then, it appears that she felt unsettled; Sarah suggested that an "English washerwoman" might have enticed Abigail with the promise of wages in exchange for her work.

In October 1783, Abigail left Jay's home, intending not to return. At Sarah Jay's request, the Paris police searched for Abigail and found her in the English washerwoman's company. By lettre de cachet, she was detained in La Petite Force, the women's wing of the city jail, the Hôtel de la Force. But she refused to return to the Jays unless she was promised passage back to America.

Jay reacted with pique to Abigail's escape attempt, writing that he could not "conceive a motive" for it, given that, he wrote, he "had promised to manumit her upon our return to America, provided she behaved properly in the meantime." He wished for her to be "punished, though not vigorously". On the advice of Benjamin Franklin, he suggested that she be left in prison for 15 to 20 days to change her mind: "Little minds cannot bear attentions & to Persons of that Class they should rather be granted than offered." To his biographer Walter Stahr, this reaction indicates that "however much [Jay] disliked slavery in the abstract, he could not understand why one of his slaves would run away."

While imprisoned, Abigail fell ill and asked to be allowed back to the Jays. William Franklin arranged her release by paying 60 livres to the jail, probably to cover her meals. Still sick, she was cared for by Sarah Jay, but died about two weeks after her release from prison. No grave, records, or signs of her life remain.
