= Portrait of John Jay =

Painting by Gilbert Stuart

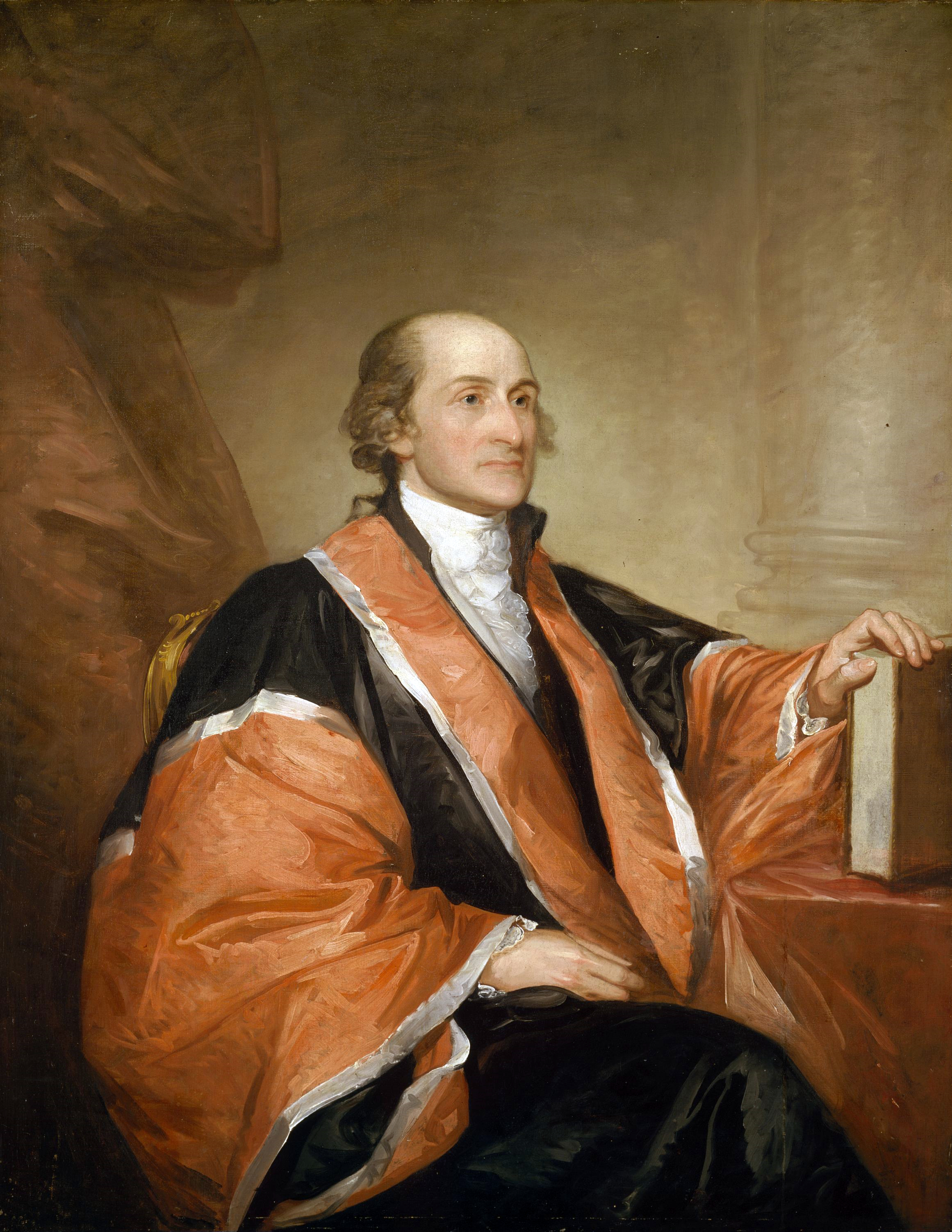
- Artist: Gilbert Stuart
- Year: 1794
- Type: Oil on canvas, portrait painting
- Dimensions: 131 cm × 102 cm (52 in × 40 in)
- Location: National Gallery of Art; Washington D.C.

Portrait of John Jay is a 1794 portrait painting by the American artist Gilbert Stuart. It depicts the Founding Father John Jay. At the time Jay was serving as Chief Justice of the United States. The same year he negotiated the Jay Treaty with Great Britain.

Stuart had known Jay in London, and he was one of his few contacts when he arrived at New York City after eighteen years abroad. Jay commissioned Stuart to paint him in the robes he wore when Harvard College awarded him an honorary degree. The sittings took place before Jay departed for England on May 12. It helped him attract further work from wealthy New Yorkers.

Today the painting is in the collection of the National Gallery of Art in Washington

== Bibliography ==
- Barratt, Carrie Rebora & Miles, Ellen G. Gilbert Stuart. Metropolitan Museum of Art, 2004.
- Staiti, Paul. Of Arms and Artists: The American Revolution through Painters' Eyes. Bloomsbury Publishing USA, 2016.
