= Sarah Livingston Jay =

Wife of Supreme Court Justice John Jay

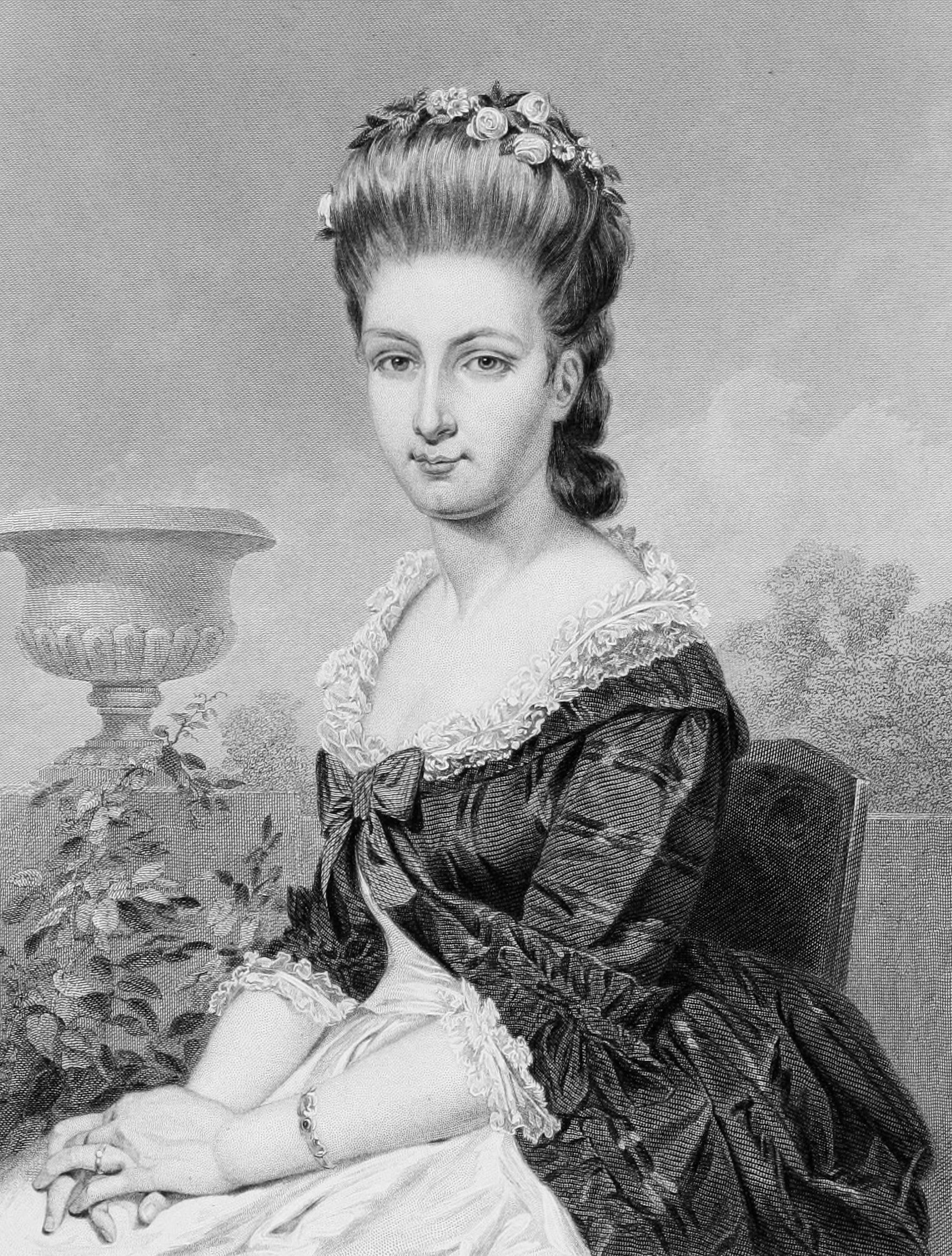

First Lady of New York
- In role July 1, 1795 – June 30, 1801
- Governor: John Jay
- Preceded by: Sarah Tappen Clinton
- Succeeded by: Gertrude Livingston Lewis (in 1804)

Personal details
- Born: Sarah Van Brugh Livingston; August 2, 1756 British America
- Died: May 28, 1802 (aged 45) Bedford, New York
- Spouse: John Jay (m. 1774)
- Children: 6, including Peter, William
- Parent(s): William Livingston; Susannah French

Sarah Van Brugh Livingston Jay (August 2, 1756 – May 28, 1802) was an American socialite and wife of Founding Father John Jay, in which capacity she was the wife of the President of the Continental Congress, of the Chief Justice of the United States, and First Lady of New York.

== Early life ==
Sarah was born in 1756. She was the fourth daughter of wealthy landowner William Livingston (1723–1790) and Susannah French (1723–1789). Her father was an attorney who was a signer of the United States Constitution and later served as the first post-colonial Governor of New Jersey during the American Revolutionary War from 1776 until his death in 1790.

Her paternal grandparents were Philip Livingston, the 2nd Lord of Livingston Manor, and Catherine Van Brugh, the only child of Albany mayor Pieter Van Brugh (1666–1740). Her paternal uncles included Robert Livingston (1708–1790), 3rd Lord of Livingston Manor, Peter Van Brugh Livingston (1710–1792), New York State Treasurer, and Philip Livingston (1716–1778), who served as a member of the New York State Senate. Through her mother, she was descended from Phillip French, the 27th Mayor of New York City, Frederick Philipse, the 1st Lord of the Philipsburg Manor, and Anthony Brockholst, an acting Governor of Colonial New York.

== Society and diplomatic role ==
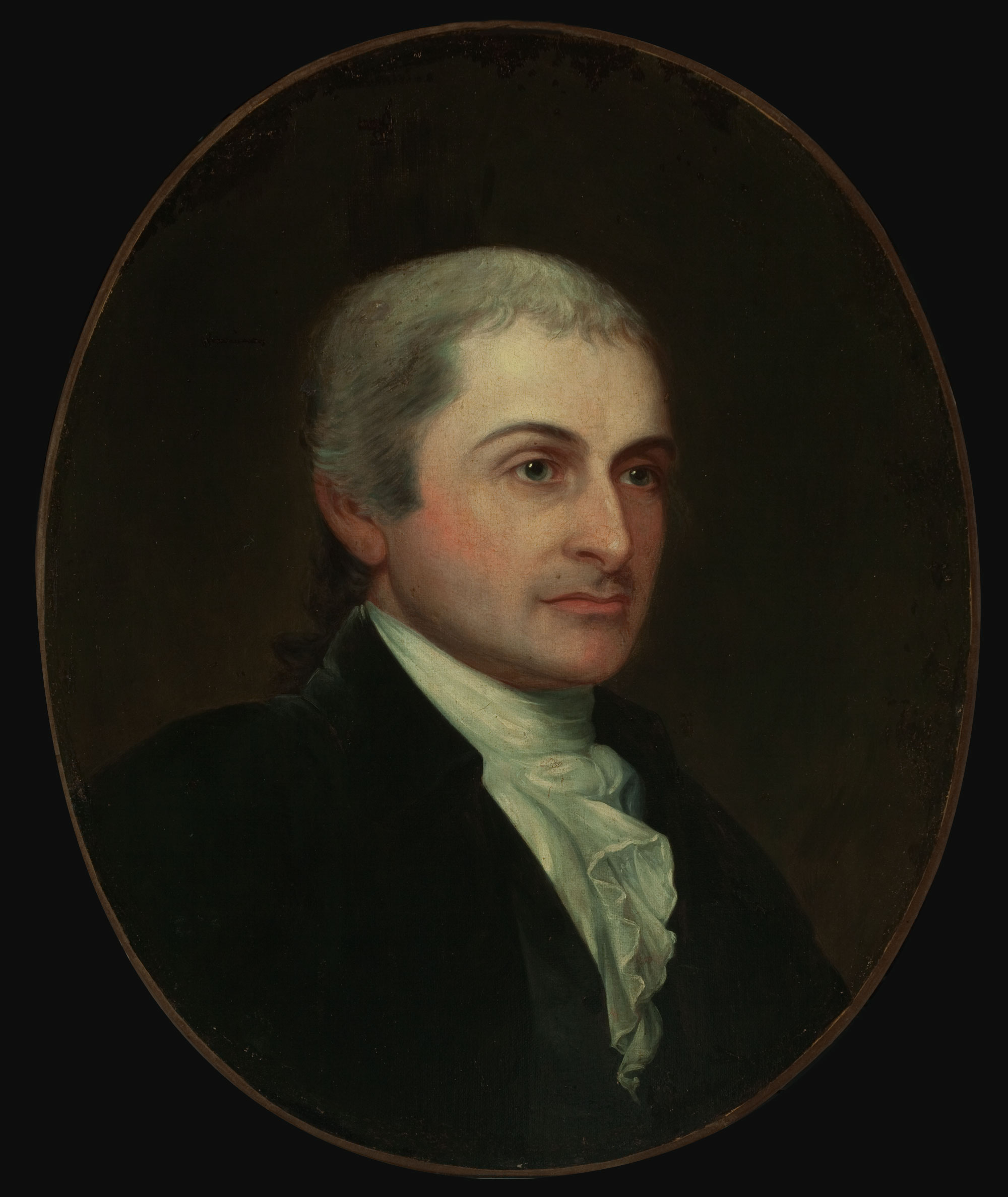
Gubernatorial portrait of John Jay

Following her wedding to Jay in 1774, she spent the early years of their marriage at her father's house in Elizabethtown, New Jersey. Her husband would visit her there when he was not serving as a state official in New York. In 1779, he was appointed commissioner to Spain and Sarah joined him, moving abroad.

In Spain, Sarah Livingston Jay's would receive one diplomatic visitor in her bedroom when she was too ill from morning sickness to rise. In France, she would plan and host the Americans' celebration of the signing of the Treaty of Paris, albeit in absentia because she had only just given birth (in Benjamin Franklin's house) when the event took place. Sarah Livingston Jay regularly attended Paris Salons and the Monday night dinners hosted by the Marquise and Marquis de Lafayette. Participating in Parisian society was part of Benjamin Franklin's strategy for tightening the bonds of French-American relations.

Sarah Livingston Jay played her part in society so well that she was once mistaken for Marie Antoinette by the audience of a theatre in Paris, "on the entrance of the American beauty, [the audience] arose to do her homage." Her social circle included Adrienne de La Fayette, Angelica Schuyler Church, Abigail Adams, Abigail Adams Smith, and Anne Willing Bingham, and the connections forged by these linkages were crucial to future diplomatic successes (Angelica Church, for example, would assist John Jay socially when he traveled to London to negotiate what would become the Jay Treaty).

=== Return to New York ===
Upon returning to New York (when Mr. Jay was appointed U.S. Foreign Secretary), Livingston Jay's experiences in Europe and French language skills were applied to hosting officials from the diplomatic corps and other guests in the U.S. capital city of New York. Livingston Jay would go on to serve in her hospitality role as the wife of the first Chief Justice of the United States and First Lady of New York. In New York, "Mrs. [Elizabeth] Hamilton, Mrs. [Sarah] Jay and Mrs. [Lucy] Knox were the leaders of official society." "In the society which marked the early days of the Republic, in New York, then the seat of the Continental Congress, Mrs. John Jay...was the acknowledged leader," and Sarah Livingston Jay's "Dinner and Supper list" for 1787-8 contained the names of notable men and women who were the midwives of a new nation, including: General and Mrs. Washington, Colonel and Mrs. Bayard, Alexander and Elizabeth Hamilton, Dr. and Mrs. Rodgers, Elias Boudinot, Daniel Huger, and the DeLancey family. An image of her handwritten list is, considered "the most famous American "society"-type document of the eighteenth century". In an era when dinner tables were the nodes of social networks, when a house was not the private realm it is perceived to be now, the social capital inherent to a dinner list was tendered as political capital.

Like many of the Founding Mothers, credit for any and all of Sarah Livingston Jay's contributions as spouse to a prominent politician have been subsumed by her husband's reputation (i.e. a consequence of coverture). As coverture is no longer the law of the land, however, subsuming Livingston Jay's biography under her husband's is to perpetuate history's error: "we think women were sitting around tending to the tatting or pouring tea, and it's our view of first ladies too and it's all wrong. These were very, very politically passionate women. Their letters are full of politics and they were utterly devoted to the patriot cause." This misunderstanding may well have been less true in Sarah Livingston Jay's lifetime than it is today: "While denied direct participation in the political system, elite women's roles as republican wives and mothers was understood by Americans at this time as a political necessity."

== Personal life ==
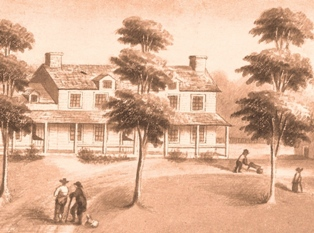
The Jay home, "Locusts", in Rye, New York

On April 28, 1774, Sarah married John Jay (1745–1829), a member of a prominent merchant family in New York City. He was one of seven surviving children born to Peter Jay and Mary Van Cortlandt, the daughter of mayor Jacobus Van Cortlandt. Together, John and Sarah Jay had six children:

- Peter Augustus Jay, who was born in Elizabeth, New Jersey, in 1776
- Susan Jay, who was born and died in Madrid in 1780
- Maria Jay, who was born in Madrid in 1782
- Ann Jay, who was born in Paris in 1783
- William Jay, who was born in New York City in 1789
- Sarah Jay, who was born in New York City in 1792.

In 1801, John Jay and Sarah Livingston Jay moved to a farm near Bedford, New York, where Sarah died in 1802.

== See also ==
- Women in the American Revolution
