= Monroe–Pinkney Treaty =

1806 treaty between the United States and Great Britain

The Monroe–Pinkney Treaty was a proposed treaty drawn up in 1806 by diplomats of the United States and United Kingdom to renew the 1795 Jay Treaty. It was rejected by President Thomas Jefferson, and never took effect. The U.S. and U.K. went to war in 1812. The proposed treaty was negotiated by the minister to Britain, James Monroe, and his associate, William Pinkney, on behalf of the Jefferson administration and by Lord Holland and Lord Auckland on behalf of the Ministry of All the Talents, a government that was headed by Lord Grenville.

For the Americans, the treaty had the goals of making the British abandon the practice of impressing sailors from American ships, addressing the neutral trading rights of American vessels during the ongoing Napoleonic Wars, and other commercial concerns.

However, the British were short of manpower for the Royal Navy and knew that many British deserters were serving on American ships. In the desperate war against Napoleon, the British believed that they could not afford to abandon impressment and that offending the Americans was seen as a much lesser evil than losing to Napoleon. Therefore, no concessions on the issue of impressment were made.

The negotiations were begun on 27 August 1806, and the treaty was signed on 31 December 1806. Jefferson received the treaty in March 1807 but was disappointed and refused to submit it to the US Senate for ratification. That failure to resolve differences over the issue of impressment and of neutral trading rights contributed to the coming of the War of 1812.
