= Mount John Jay =

Mountain in Canada and Alaska, United States

- Location within Alaska Location within British Columbia

Highest point
- Elevation: 7,507 ft (2,288 m)
- Prominence: 1,962 ft (598 m)
- Isolation: 4.82 mi (7.76 km)
- Coordinates: 56°8′29″N 130°25′32″W

Geography
- Location: Ketchikan Gateway Borough, Alaska, United States; Kitimat–Stikine, British Columbia, Canada
- Parent range: Coast Mountains
- Topo map: NTS 104B1 LeDuc Glacier

Mount John Jay, also known as Boundary Peak 18, a summit located on the border between Ketchikan Gateway Borough, Alaska, U.S. and Kitimat–Stikine, British Columbia, Canada. It is named after American statesman and diplomat John Jay, one of the Founding Fathers.
