= Fort au Fer (New York) =

Fort in New York state

Coordinates: 44°56.649′N 73°21.149′W

Fort au Fer was a British fort, established in 1775 on Lake Champlain, New York approximately 1 mile south of Rouses Point. It was occupied by General John Burgoyne during his Saratoga campaign in 1777, and remained in British hands until 1796, following the 1794 Jay Treaty.

The fort started as a large two floor stone house (The White House) in 1770. Along with more brick barracks and a stockade, it was fortified with entrenchments and cannon in 1775.

The fort was destroyed by fire in 1805.

A historic markers near the site are located at 548 Point au Fer Road, at the intersection with Scales Road and 534 Point au Fer Road.

Richard Scales home built in 1809 is the site of the old fort.
