= Jay Treaty =

1794 treaty between the US and Great Britain

Treaty of Amity, Commerce, and Navigation, Between His Britannic Majesty and The United States of America
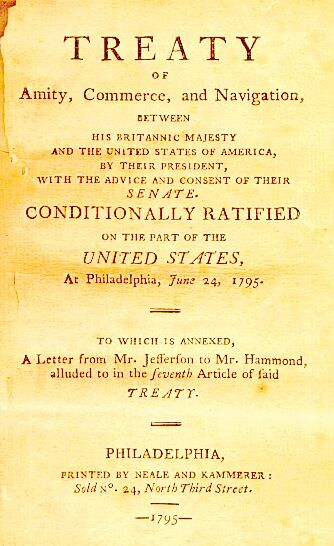
- First page of the Jay Treaty
- Context: To relieve post-war tension between Great Britain and the United States
- Signed: November 19, 1794
- Location: London
- Effective: February 29, 1796
- Negotiators: (Kingdom of Great Britain) William Grenville, 1st Baron Grenville; (United States) John Jay
- Parties: Great Britain; United States

Full text
- Jay's Treaty at Wikisource

The Treaty of Amity, Commerce, and Navigation, Between His Britannic Majesty and the United States of America, commonly known as the Jay Treaty, and also as Jay's Treaty, was a 1794 treaty between the United States and Great Britain that averted war, resolved issues remaining since the 1783 Treaty of Paris (which ended the American Revolutionary War), and facilitated ten years of peaceful trade between Americans and the British in the midst of the French Revolutionary Wars, which had begun in 1792. For the Americans, the treaty's policy was designed by Treasury Secretary Alexander Hamilton, supported by President George Washington. It angered France and bitterly divided American public opinion, encouraging the growth of two opposing American political parties, the pro-Treaty Federalists and the anti-Treaty Democratic-Republicans.

The treaty was negotiated by John Jay (also a negotiator of the earlier Paris treaty) and gained several of the primary American goals. This included a British withdrawal from forts in the Northwest Territory that Britain had refused to relinquish under the terms of the Treaty of Paris. The British had refused to do so as the United States had reneged on Articles 4 and 6 of the Treaty of Paris; American state courts impeded the collection of debts owed to British creditors and upheld the confiscation of Loyalist-owned property in spite of an explicit understanding that such persecutions would be immediately discontinued. Both parties agreed that disputes over wartime debts and the Canada–United States border were to be sent to arbitration (one of the first major uses of arbitration in modern diplomatic history), which set a precedent used by other nations. American merchants were granted limited rights to trade with the British West Indies in exchange for limits on export of cotton from the U.S.

Signed on November 19, 1794 during the Thermidorian Reaction in France, the treaty was submitted to the United States Senate for its advice and consent the following June. It was ratified by the Senate on June 24, 1795, by a two-thirds majority vote of 20–10 (exactly the minimum number necessary for concurrence). It was also ratified by the First Pitt ministry, and took effect February 29, 1796, the day when ratifications were officially exchanged.

The treaty was hotly contested by Democratic-Republicans in each state. An effort was made to block it in the House of Representatives, which ultimately failed. Democratic-Republican politicians feared that closer American economic and political ties with Britain would strengthen Hamilton's Federalist Party, promote aristocracy and undercut republicanism. This debate crystallized the emerging partisan divisions and shaped the new "First Party System", with Federalists favoring the British and Democratic-Republicans favoring France. The treaty was to last for ten years, and efforts to agree on a replacement treaty failed in 1806 when Jefferson rejected the Monroe–Pinkney Treaty in the prelude to the War of 1812.

== Issues ==
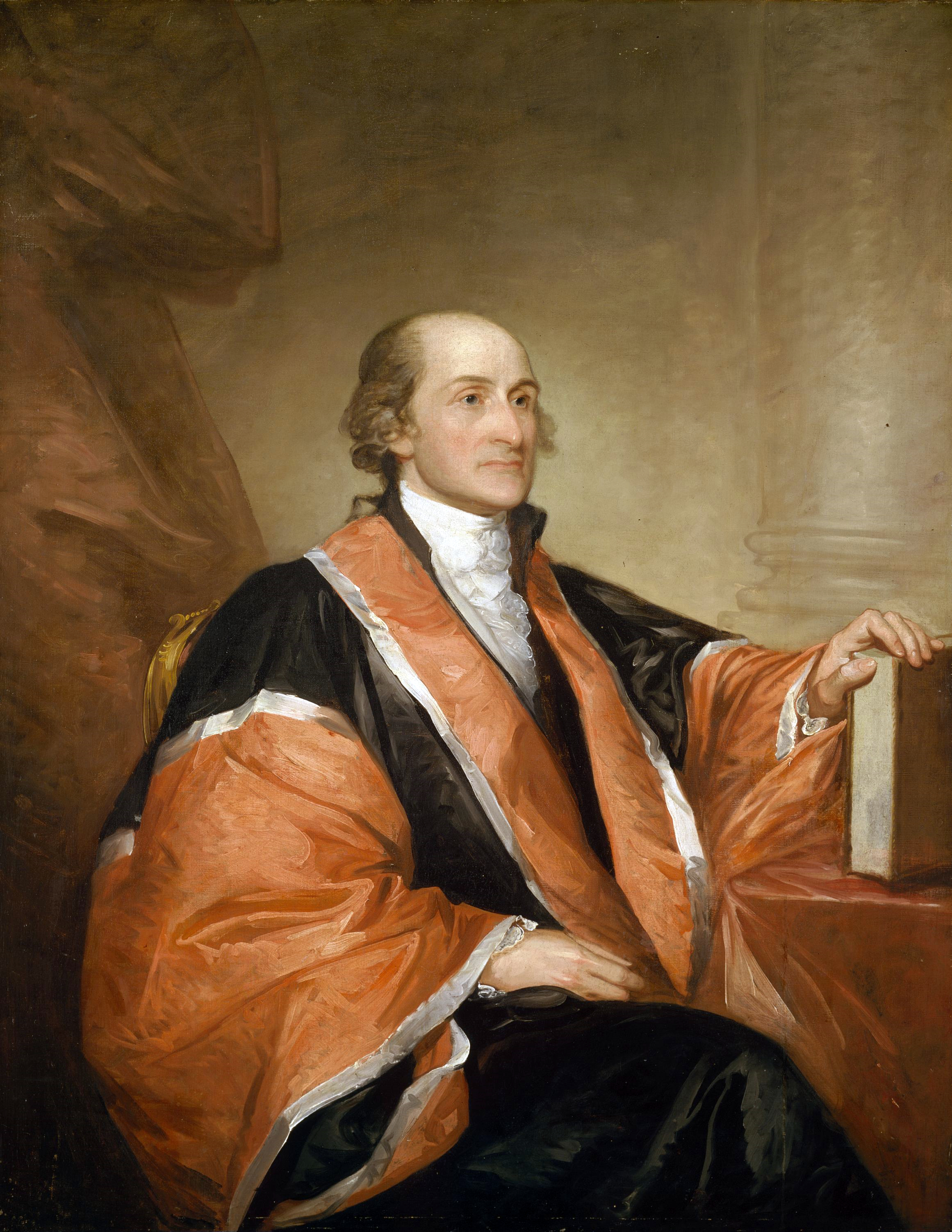
Portrait of John Jay by Gilbert Stuart, 1794. Jay was chief American negotiator

The outbreak of the French Revolutionary Wars in Europe in 1792 ended the long peace that had enabled the new United States to flourish in terms of trade and finance. The Americans emerged as an important neutral country with a large shipping trade. From the British perspective, improving their relations with the United States was a high priority lest it move into the French sphere of influence. British negotiators ignored elements in Britain that wanted harsher terms in order to get a suitable treaty. From the American viewpoint, the most pressing foreign policy issues were normalizing the trade relations with Britain, the United States' leading trading partner, and resolving issues left over from the Treaty of Paris. As one observer explained, the British government was "well disposed to America... They have made their arrangements upon a plan that comprehends the neutrality of the United States, and are anxious that it should be preserved."

After Britain became involved in the conflict against France in 1793, the Royal Navy seized nearly 300 American merchant ships trading with the French West Indies. The American public was outraged, and Republicans in Jefferson's coalition demanded a declaration of war on Britain, but James Madison instead called for an embargo on British trade.

At the same time, the British continued to supply weapons to Native Americans resisting U.S. expansion in the Ohio Country, further worsening Anglo-American relations. Congress voted on a trade embargo against Britain in March 1794. It was approved in the House of Representatives but defeated in the Senate when Vice-President John Adams cast a tie-breaking vote against it. At the national level American politics was divided between the factions of Jefferson and Madison, which favored the French, and the Federalists led by Hamilton, who saw Britain as a natural ally and thus sought to normalize relations with the British, especially in the area of trade. President George Washington sided with Hamilton. Hamilton devised a framework for negotiations, and Washington sent Chief Justice of the United States John Jay to London to negotiate a comprehensive treaty.

The U.S. government had several outstanding issues to resolve with Britain:

- The British were continuing to occupy forts on U.S. territory in the Great Lakes region, specifically the forts of Detroit and Mackinac in modern-day Michigan, Niagara and Oswego in New York, and Miami in modern-day Ohio. Britain refused to withdraw from the forts in response to American refusals to pay debts that had been agreed upon or halt the confiscation of Loyalist properties.
- The Royal Navy was impressing sailors from American merchantmen who they alleged were deserters from the British navy.
- U.S. merchants wanted compensation for the almost 300 American merchantmen which the Royal Navy had seized between 1793 and 1794.
- Southern interests wanted financial compensation for the U.S. enslavers whose slaves had escaped to British lines and been evacuated at the end of the Revolutionary War.
- U.S. merchants wanted the British West Indies to be reopened to American trade.
- The boundary with Canada was vague in many places, and needed to be more sharply delineated.
- The British were providing weapons and ammunition to Native Americans in the Northwest Territory who were resisting U.S. expansion.

== Treaty terms ==
Both sides achieved many objectives. Several issues were sent to arbitration, which (after years of discussion) were resolved amicably mostly in favor of the U.S. Britain paid $11,650,000 for damages to American shipping and received £600,000 for unpaid pre-1775 debts. While international arbitration was not entirely unknown, the Jay Treaty gave it a strong impetus and is generally taken as the start of modern international arbitration.

Map of forts occupied by the British prior to the Jay Treaty. Click the map to view a larger size.

The British agreed to vacate its forts in United States territory—six in the Great Lakes region and two at the north end of Lake Champlain—by June 1796; which was done. They were:

Name	Present-day location
Fort au Fer	Lake Champlain – Champlain, New York
Fort Dutchman's Point	Lake Champlain – North Hero, Vermont
Fort Lernoult (including Fort Detroit)	Detroit River – Detroit, Michigan
Fort Mackinac	Straits of Mackinac – Mackinac Island, Michigan
Fort Miami	Maumee River – Maumee, Ohio
Fort Niagara	Niagara River – Youngstown, New York
Fort Ontario	Lake Ontario – Oswego, New York
Fort Oswegatchie	Saint Lawrence River – Ogdensburg, New York

The treaty was "surprisingly generous" in allowing Americans to trade with Great Britain on a most-favored-nation basis. In return, the United States gave most favored nation trading status to Britain, and acquiesced in British anti-French maritime policies. American merchants obtained limited rights to trade in the British West Indies. Two joint boundary commissions were set up to establish the boundary line in the Northeast (it agreed on one) and in the Northwest (this commission never met and the boundary was settled after the War of 1812).

Jay, a strong opponent of slavery despite being a slaveholder, dropped the issue of compensation to U.S. enslavers, which angered Southern slaveholders and was used as a target for attacks by Jeffersonians. Jay was unsuccessful in negotiating a temporary end to the Royal Navy's impressment of alleged deserters from American merchantmen, which later became a key issue leading to the War of 1812.

=== Native American rights ===
Article III states, "It is agreed, that it shall at all times be free to His Majesty's subjects, and to the citizens of the United States, and also to the Indians dwelling on either side of the said boundary line, freely to pass and repass, by land or inland navigation into the respective territories and countries of the two parties on the continent of America, (the country within the limits of the Hudson's Bay Company only excepted) ... and freely carry on trade and commerce with each other." Article III of the Jay Treaty declared the right of Native Americans, American citizens, and Canadian subjects to trade and travel between the United States and Canada, which was then a territory of Great Britain. Some legal experts dispute whether the treaty rights were abrogated by the War of 1812. In Canada, the Supreme Court ruled in 1956 that the Jay Treaty is "currently not in force". Nevertheless, the United States has codified this right in the provisions of Section 289 of the Immigration and Nationality Act of 1952 and as amended in 1965. As a result of the Jay Treaty, "Native Indians born in Canada are therefore entitled to enter the United States for the purpose of employment, study, retirement, investing, and/or immigration" if they can prove that they have at least 50% blood quantum, and cannot be deported for any reason. Article III of the Jay Treaty is the basis of most Native American claims. Unlike other legal immigrants, Canadian-born Native Americans residing in the US are entitled to public benefits and domestic tuition fees on the same basis as citizens.

== Approval and dissent ==
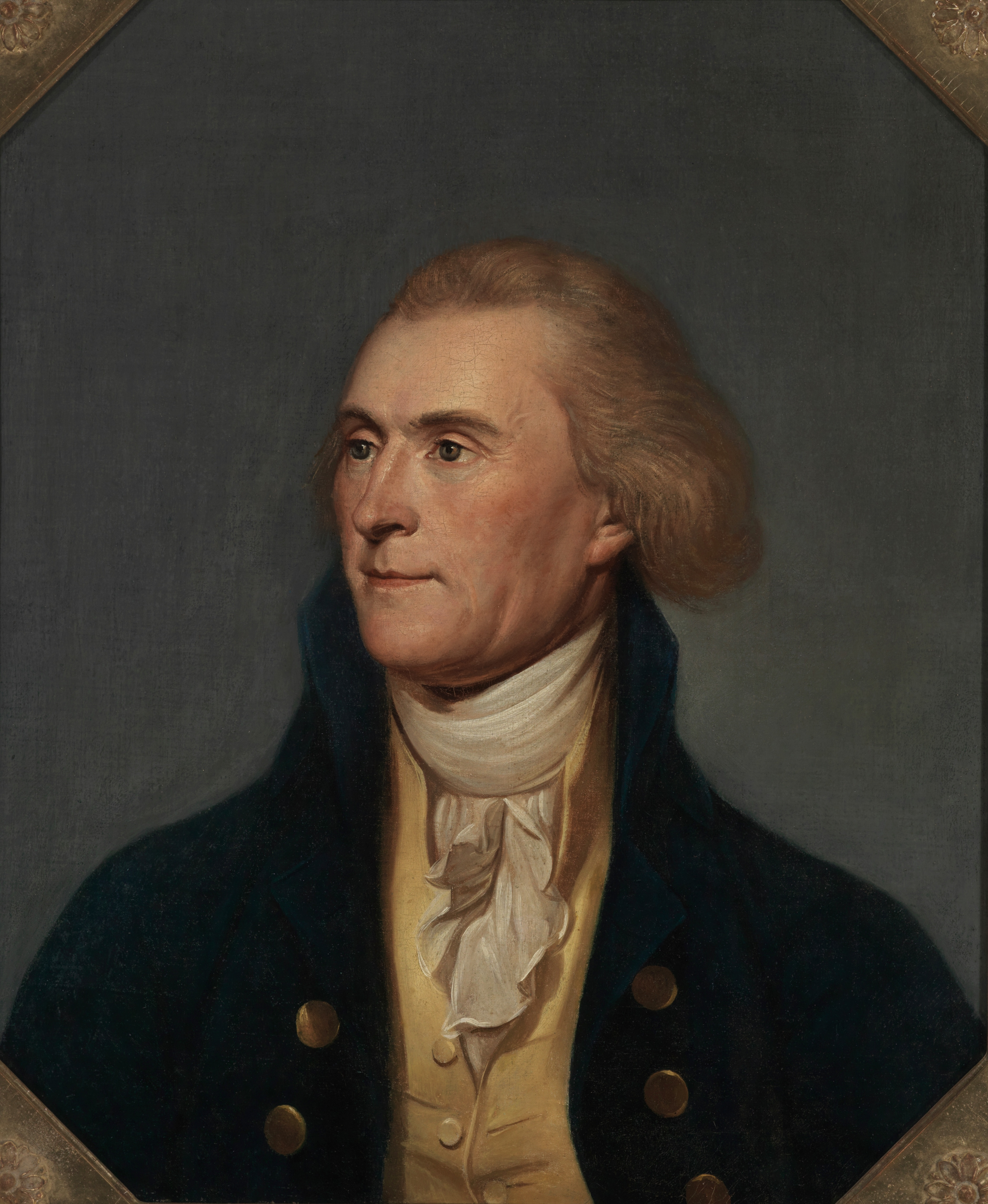
Thomas Jefferson was harshly critical of the treaty.

Washington submitted the treaty to the United States Senate for its consent in June 1795; a two-thirds vote was needed. The treaty was unpopular at first and gave the Jeffersonians a platform to rally new supporters. As historian Paul Varg explains,

The Jay Treaty was a reasonable give-and-take compromise of the issues between the two countries. What rendered it so assailable was not the compromise spelled out between the two nations but the fact that it was not a compromise between the two political parties at home. Embodying the views of the Federalists, the treaty repudiated the foreign policy of the opposing party.

The Jeffersonians were opposed to Britain, preferring support for France in the wars raging in Europe, and they argued that the treaty with France from 1778 was still in effect. They considered Britain as the center of aristocracy and the chief threat to the United States' republican values. They denounced Hamilton and Jay (and even Washington) as monarchists who betrayed American values. They organized public protests against Jay and his treaty; one of their rallying cries said: Damn John Jay! Damn everyone that won't damn John Jay! Damn every one that won't put lights in his window and sit up all night damning John Jay! Town hall meetings in Philadelphia turned from debate to disorder in the summer of 1795 as rocks were thrown, British officials harassed, and a copy of the treaty burnt at the door of one of America's wealthiest merchants and U.S. Senator, William Bingham.

The treaty was one of the major catalysts for the advent of the First Party System in the United States by further dividing the two major political factions within the country. The Federalist Party, led by Hamilton, supported the treaty. On the contrary, the Democratic-Republican Party, led by Jefferson and Madison, opposed it. Jefferson and his supporters had a counter-proposal to establish "a direct system of commercial hostility with Great Britain", even at the risk of war. The Jeffersonians raised public opinion to fever pitch by accusing the British of supporting Native American attacks on U.S. colonizers on the frontier. The fierce debates over the treaty in 1794–95, according to one historian, "transformed the Republican movement into a Republican party". To fight the treaty, the Jeffersonians "established coordination in activity between leaders at the capital, and leaders, actives and popular followings in the states, counties and towns". Jay's failure to obtain compensation for "lost" slaves galvanized the South into opposition.

Washington supported the Jay Treaty because he did not want American merchant ships to be at risk of being seized by the powerful Royal Navy, and he decided to take his chances with a hostile French Navy that would mostly be bottled up in Europe by the British blockade. By backing the treaty, he sacrificed the unanimous respect and goodwill that the whole country had given across his service as commander-in-chief of the Continental Army, president of the Constitutional Convention, and President of the United States to that point. He was heavily criticized in Democratic-Republican areas of the country like his home state of Virginia. Numerous protestors would picket Mount Vernon and show their anger towards him. Newspapers and cartoons showed Washington being sent to the guillotine. A common protest rally cry was, "A speedy death to General Washington." Some protestors even wanted Washington to be impeached. It was only after Washington's death in 1799 when the whole country reunited and wholeheartedly respected him again.

The Federalists fought back and Congress rejected the Jefferson–Madison counter-proposals. Washington threw his great prestige behind the treaty, and Federalists rallied public opinion more effectively than did their opponents. Hamilton convinced President Washington that it was the best treaty that could be expected. Washington insisted that the U.S. must remain neutral in the European wars; he signed it, and his prestige carried the day in Congress. The Federalists made a strong, systematic appeal to public opinion, which rallied their own supporters and shifted the debate. Washington and Hamilton outmaneuvered Madison, who was opposition leader. Hamilton by then was out of the government, and he was the dominant figure who helped secure the treaty's approval by the needed 2/3 vote in the Senate. The Senate passed a resolution in June, advising the President to amend the treaty by suspending the 12th article, which concerned trade between the U.S. and the West Indies. In mid-August, the Senate ratified the treaty 20–10, with the condition that the treaty contain specific language regarding the June 24 resolution. President Washington signed it in late August. The treaty was proclaimed in effect on February 29, 1796, but there remained one final, bitter legislative battle. The House of Representatives, which had a Democratic-Republican majority, had to agree to appropriate the funds needed to fulfill the Jay Treaty's terms. In April 1796, after two months of bitter fighting that could have doomed the treaty if the House refused to pass the funding related to the Jay Treaty, Federalist Representative Fisher Ames limped to the podium despite being gravely sick and gave an impassioned speech that was later described as one of the greatest speeches in American history in defense of the Jay Treaty. After the 90-minute speech he fell exhausted in his chair and there was an emotional silence in a sign of bipartisan respect for his speech. In the final vote on April 29, 1796, the impasse was stuck in a 49 to 49 tie. The first Speaker of the House (no longer in that office by 1796), Democratic-Republican Representative Frederick Muhlenberg, was chairman of the Committee of the Whole that was responsible for this funding bill. The year before he had led protests that included burning copies of the Jay Treaty in front of the home of the British ambassador to the United States, George Hammond. Everyone in the House chamber believed Muhlenberg was going to kill the Jay Treaty. He shockingly voted yes to fund the treaty. The final vote after one representative flipped his vote to support Muhlenberg after Muhlenberg's tiebreaking decision was 51 to 48. As a symbol of how chaotic and violent the anti-Jay Treaty protests were from 1794 to 1796 Muhlenberg not only killed his political career with his decision but he was stabbed by his brother-in-law who believed he had committed treason when he voted in support of the funding of the Jay Treaty. Muhlenberg survived the attack but faded into obscurity for the rest of his life, never winning another election.

James Madison, then a member of the House of Representatives, argued that the treaty could not, under Constitutional law, take effect without approval of the House, since it regulated commerce and exercised legislative powers granted to Congress. The debate which followed was an early example of originalism, in which Madison, the "Father of the Constitution", lost. One feature of this nationwide constitutional debate was an advisory opinion on the subject written by Chief Justice Oliver Ellsworth, in which he rejected any alleged right of the House of Representatives to decide upon the merits of the treaty. After defeat on the treaty in Congress, the Jeffersonian Republicans lost the 1796 presidential election on the issue.

When Thomas Jefferson became president in 1801, he did not repudiate the treaty. He kept the Federalist minister, Rufus King, in London to negotiate a successful resolution to outstanding issues regarding cash payments and boundaries. The amity broke down when the treaty expired in 1805. Jefferson rejected a renewal of the Jay Treaty in the Monroe–Pinkney Treaty of 1806 as negotiated by his diplomats and agreed to by London. Relations turned increasingly hostile as a prelude to the War of 1812. In 1815, the Treaty of Ghent superseded the Jay Treaty.

The treaty led to the permanent rupture of decades of close friendship and camaraderie between President Washington and the anti-Jay Treaty Thomas Jefferson and James Madison. Jefferson wrote a scathing private letter that secretly called Washington senile and an "apostate" who subverted American liberty to "the harlot England". He also secretly financed and ordered newspapers to personally attack Washington with accusations of mental illness and treason. Madison, even though he wrote the Constitution, claimed as a partisan Democratic-Republican member of the House of Representatives that the House also has an equal role in the treaty-making process. Washington had to personally find the secret minutes of the 1787 Constitutional Convention where Madison himself said treaties are conducted by only the Senate and President, and he had to argue against Madison with Madison's own words from the Constitutional Convention. Madison forced Washington to invoke executive privilege over this issue. Washington never saw or spoke to Jefferson and Madison ever again after the ratification of the Jay Treaty. Martha Washington said that the election of Jefferson as president in 1800 was the second worst day of her life after the death of her husband, and she believed the shocking words and actions by them towards Washington hastened his death only 2 years after leaving office.

== Evaluations ==
Historians Stanley Elkins and Eric McKitrick note that, in conventional diplomatic terms and as a "piece of adversary bargaining", Jay "got much the worst of the 'bargain'. Such a view has to a great degree persisted ever since." They conclude that Jay did not succeed in asserting neutral rights, but he did obtain "his other sine qua nons"; he got none of things that were "desirable, but not indispensable". They add that Jay's record on the symbolic side was open to many objections. However, on the "hard" (or realistic) side, "it was a substantial success, which included the prevention of war with Great Britain".

Historian Marshall Smelser argues that the treaty effectively postponed war with Britain, or at least postponed it until the United States was strong enough to handle it. Bradford Perkins argued in 1955 that the treaty was the first to establish a special relationship between Britain and the United States, with a second installment under Lord Salisbury. In his view, the treaty worked for ten years to secure peace between Britain and the United States: "The decade may be characterized as the period of 'The First Rapprochement'." As Perkins concludes,

For about ten years there was peace on the frontier, joint recognition of the value of commercial intercourse, and even, by comparison with both preceding and succeeding epochs, a muting of strife over ship seizures and impressment. Two controversies with France ... pushed the English-speaking powers even more closely together.

Starting at swords' point in 1794, the Jay Treaty reversed the tensions; Perkins concludes: "Through a decade of world war and peace, successive governments on both sides of the Atlantic were able to bring about and preserve a cordiality which often approached genuine friendship." Perkins suggests that, except perhaps the opening of trade with British India, "Jay did fail to win anything the Americans were not obviously entitled to, liberation of territory recognized as theirs since 1782, and compensation for seizures that even Britain admitted were illegal". He also speculates that a "more astute negotiator than the Chief Justice" would have gotten better terms than he did. He quoted the opinion of "great historian" Henry Adams that the treaty was a "bad one":

No one would venture on its merits to defend it now. There has been no time since 1810 when the United States would not prefer war to peace on such terms.

Perkins gave more weight than other historians to valuable concessions regarding trade with British India and the concession on the West Indies trade. In addition, Perkins noted that the Royal Navy treated American commerce with "relative leniency" during the late 18th and early 19th centuries, and many impressed seamen were returned to the United States. As Spain assessed the informal Anglo-American alliance, it softened its previous opposition to the United States' use of the Mississippi River and signed Pinckney's Treaty, which the Americans wanted. When Jefferson took office, he gained renewal of the commercial articles that had greatly benefited American shipping.

Elkins and McKitrick find this more positive view open to "one big difficulty": it requires that the British negotiated in the same spirit. Unlike Perkins, they find "little indication of this". George Herring's 2008 history of US foreign policy says that, in 1794, "the United States and Britain edged toward war" and concludes, "The Jay Treaty brought the United States important concessions and served its interests well." Joseph Ellis finds the terms of the treaty "one-sided in Britain's favor", but asserts with a consensus of historians that it was

a shrewd bargain for the United States. It bet, in effect, on England rather than France as the hegemonic European power of the future, which proved prophetic. It recognized the massive dependence of the American economy on trade with England. In a sense it was a precocious preview of the Monroe Doctrine (1823), for it linked American security and economic development to the British fleet, which provided a protective shield of incalculable value throughout the nineteenth century. Mostly, it postponed war with England until America was economically and politically more capable of fighting one.

== In popular culture ==
In the HBO miniseries John Adams, Vice President John Adams is shown casting the tiebreaker vote in favor of ratifying the Jay Treaty. In reality, his vote was never required as the Senate passed the resolution by 20–10. Furthermore, the Vice President would never be required to cast a vote in a treaty ratification, because the Vice President votes only in case of a tie, and Article II of the Constitution requires that treaties receive a two-thirds vote for approval. Vice President Adams had however earlier cast a tie-breaking vote in opposition to a trade embargo on the British in 1794.

== See also ==
- First Party System
- Timeline of United States diplomatic history
- Timeline of British diplomatic history
- United Kingdom–United States relations
- Karnuth v. United States ex rel. Albro (holding that Article III of the Jay Treaty was nullified by the War of 1812)

== Bibliography ==
- Bemis, Samuel Flagg. Jay's Treaty: A Study in Commerce and Diplomacy (1923) remains the standard narrative of how treaty was written online
- Charles, Joseph. "The Jay Treaty: The Origins of the American Party System", in William and Mary Quarterly, (1955) 12#4 pp. 581–630 JSTOR 1918627
- Combs, Jerald. A. The Jay Treaty: Political Background of Founding Fathers (1970) (ISBN 0-520-01573-8) Focusing on the domestic and ideological aspects, Combs dislikes Hamilton's quest for national power and a "heroic state" dominating the Western Hemisphere, but concludes the Federalists "followed the proper policy" because the treaty preserved peace with Britain.
- Elkins, Stanley M. and Eric McKitrick, The Age of Federalism: The Early American Republic, 1788–1800. (1994), ch. 9
- Estes, Todd (2001). "The Art of Presidential Leadership: George Washington and the Jay Treaty". Virginia Magazine of History and Biography. 109 (2): 127–158. JSTOR 4249911.
- —— (2000). "Shaping the Politics of Public Opinion: Federalists and the Jay Treaty Debate". Journal of the Early Republic. 20 (3): 393–422. doi:10.2307/3125063. JSTOR 3125063.
- —— (2006). The Jay Treaty Debate, Public Opinion, and the Evolution of Early American Political Culture. University of Massachusetts Press. ISBN 978-1-5584-9515-9.
- Farrell, James M. "Fisher Ames and Political Judgment: Reason, Passion, and Vehement Style in the Jay Treaty Speech", Quarterly Journal of Speech 1990 76(4): 415–434.
- Fewster, Joseph M. "The Jay Treaty and British Ship Seizures: the Martinique Cases". William and Mary Quarterly 1988 45(3): 426–452 JSTOR 1923643
- Hatter, Lawrence B. A. Citizens of Convenience: The Imperial Origins of American Nationhood on the U.S.–Canadian Border. Charlottesville: University of Virginia Press, 2017.
- Hatter, Lawrence B. A. "The Jay Charter: Rethinking the American National State in the West, 1796–1819," Diplomatic History, 37 (September 2013): 693–726 doi:10.1093/dh/dht032
- Negus, Samuel D. "'Further concessions cannot be attained': the Jay-Grenville treaty and the politics of Anglo-American relations, 1789–1807. Texas Christian University, 2013. (PhD thesis) online
- Nickels, Bryan (2001). "Native American Free Passage Rights Under the 1794 Jay Treaty: Survival Under United States Statutory Law and Canadian Common Law". Boston College International and Comparative Law Journal. 24 (2). Boston College Law School: 313–340. Archived from the original on October 13, 2013.
- Perkins, Bradford. The First Rapprochement: England and the United States, 1795–1805 1955.
- Perkins, Bradford. "Lord Hawkesbury and the Jay–Grenville Negotiations", The Mississippi Valley Historical Review, 40#2 (Sep. 1953), pp. 291–304 JSTOR 1888929
- Rakove, Jack N. Original Meanings: Politics and Ideas in the Making of the Constitution. Alfred A. Knopf, New York. 1997. ISBN 0-394-57858-9
- Smith, Page (1962). John Adams. Vol. II, 1784–1826. New York: Doubleday & Company, Inc. ISBN 978-0837123486. OCLC 852986620.
- Varg, Paul A. Foreign Policies of the Founding Fathers. 1963. online
