= Contested United States presidential elections =

Contested US Presidential elections involve serious allegations by top officials that the election was "stolen." Such allegations appeared in 1824, 1876, 1912, 1960, 2000, and 2020. Typically, the precise allegations change over time.

== 1800 presidential election ==
In 1800, the Democratic-Republican candidates won the election and intended for party leader Thomas Jefferson to be president and New York politician Aaron Burr to be vice president. Both men ended up tied in the electoral college, but Burr wanted the job. The decision went to the House where the Federalists were powerful enough to stop Jefferson. Federalist leader Alexander Hamilton was a long-time foe of Jefferson but he deeply distrusted Burr. Hamilton helped arrange for Jefferson to be elected president and Burr vice president. A constitutional amendment was passed to prevent similar confusion.

== 1824 presidential election ==
In 1824, political parties were very weak, and the voters had the choice of four candidates: Andrew Jackson, John Quincy Adams, William H. Crawford, and Henry Clay. Jackson had won the popular and electoral vote, but not the majority. According to the Constitution, the House of Representatives had to vote among the top three. Henry Clay was now out of the running, but as Speaker of the House, he played a major role in the decision. He helped Adams win, and Adams rewarded him by appointing him as Secretary of State. To a friend, Clay explained that Jackson's militarism threatened American democracy:

"As a friend of Liberty, and to the permanence of our institutions, I cannot consent…by contributing to the election of a military chieftain, to give the strongest guarantee that this republic will march in the fatal road which has conducted every other republic to ruin."

Jackson was livid: "The Judas of the West has closed the contract and will receive the thirty pieces of silver. His end will be the same." Jackson cried foul, believing the election was stolen by a "corrupt bargain" between Adams and Clay. He ran again and defeated Adams in 1828, using partisan rhetoric that Robert V. Remini says was, "almost totally devoid of truth."

== 1876 presidential election ==
In 1876, Republican Rutherford B. Hayes was awarded the White House by a partisan special Congressional commission. The result remains among the most disputed to this day. Although it is not disputed that Democrat Samuel J. Tilden outpolled Hayes in the popular vote, there were wide allegations of electoral fraud, election violence, and other disfranchisement of predominantly Republican Black voters. After a first count of votes, Tilden had won 184 electoral votes to Hayes's 165, with 20 votes from four states unresolved. In Florida, Louisiana, and South Carolina, both parties reported their candidate to have won the state. In Oregon, one elector was replaced after being declared illegal for having been an "elected or appointed official." The question of who should have been awarded those 20 electoral votes remains in dispute among historians, with most suggesting the Republicans were guilty.

== 1912 presidential election ==
In 1908, President Theodore Roosevelt made sure the Republicans Party nominated his close friend William Howard Taft for president. Taft won, however Roosevelt was dissatisfied and challenged Taft for the 1912 nomination. Roosevelt accused Taft of "stealing " the Republican nomination. Roosevelt thereupon ran a third party ticket, allowing Democrat Woodrow Wilson to win. According to Lewis L. Gould,

Roosevelt saw Taft as the agent of "the forces of reaction and of political crookedness"....Roosevelt had become the most dangerous man in American history, said Taft, "because of his hold upon the less intelligent voters and the discontented." The Republican National Committee, dominated by the Taft forces, awarded 235 delegates to the president and 19 to Roosevelt, thereby ensuring Taft's renomination....Firm in his conviction that the nomination was being stolen from him, Roosevelt....told cheering supporters that there was "a great moral issue" at stake...."Fearless of the future; unheeding of our individual fates; with unflinching hearts and undimmed eyes; we stand at Armageddon, and we battle for the Lord!"

== 2000 presidential election ==
On election night, it was unclear who had won, with the state of Florida still undecided. The final returns showed that Republican George W. Bush had won Florida by 537 votes out of six million cast. Democrat Al Gore was allowed by state law to demand recounts in selected counties. They wanted recounts in Democratic strongholds as it was predicted that votes had been miscounted in these counties. Republicans sued on the grounds the narrow recount unfairly ignored voters in other counties. A month-long series of legal battles led to the highly controversial 5–4 Supreme Court decision Bush v. Gore, which accepted the Republican argument, ended the recount, and left Bush the winner by 500 votes. Following the announcement of the Supreme Court's decision, Gore stated that "Now the U.S. Supreme Court has spoken. Let there be no doubt, while I strongly disagree with the court's decision, I accept it. I accept the finality of this outcome which will be ratified next Monday in the Electoral College. And tonight, for the sake of our unity of the people and the strength of our democracy, I offer my concession." Despite objections from some Democrats, Gore (acting in his capacity as President of the Senate) presided over the certification of Bush's victory on January 6, 2001.

== 2020 presidential election ==
The stolen election conspiracy theory claims that the 2020 United States presidential election was "stolen" from Donald Trump, who lost to Joe Biden. It serves to justify attempts to overturn the 2020 United States presidential election, including the January 6 United States Capitol attack. A particular variant of it is the "Soros stole the election" conspiracy theory that claims that George Soros stole the election from Trump. Polls conducted since the aftermath of the 2020 election have consistently shown that majority of Republicans falsely believe that the election was "stolen" from Trump. Donald Trump's legal teams brought a variety of legal challenges to the results in several swing states, however these failed to alter the outcome of the election and were generally considered meritless by the judges who heard the suits. These challenges included an appeal to the Supreme Court of the United States, which declined to hear argument regarding three petitions brought by the Trump campaign.

One aspect of President Trump's campaign to cast doubt on the results of the 2020 election was an effort to impeach the credibility of various companies involved in election administration. Some media companies which editorialized in favor of Trump were later sued for defamation by companies implicated in their reporting, including Dominion Voting Systems and Smartmatic. Smartmatic's lawsuit against Fox News remains active. On April 18, 2023, Dominion Voting Systems and Fox News announced a settlement in that case worth $787,500,000.

== See also ==
- 2008 United States Senate election in Minnesota
- List of conspiracy theories
- American election campaigns in the 19th century
- Election denial movement in the United States
