= History of the Supreme Court of the United States =

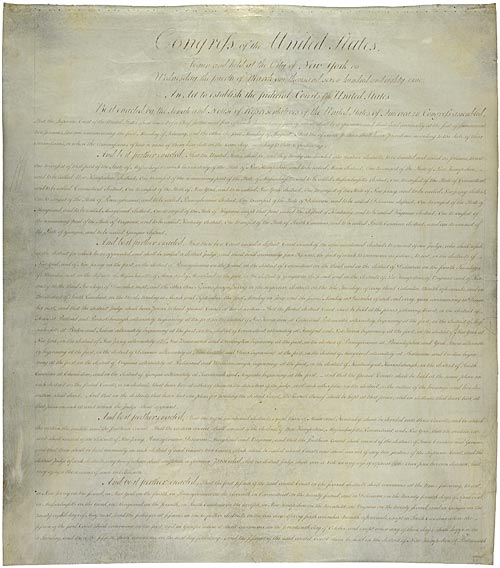
The Judiciary Act of 1789 implemented the entire federal judicial branch, including the Supreme Court. It was also the first act by Congress to be partially invalidated by the Supreme Court.

The Supreme Court of the United States is the only court specifically established by the Constitution of the United States, implemented in 1789; under the Judiciary Act of 1789, the Court was to be composed of six members—though the number of justices has been nine in its history, this number is set by Congress, not the Constitution. The court convened for the first time on February 2, 1790.

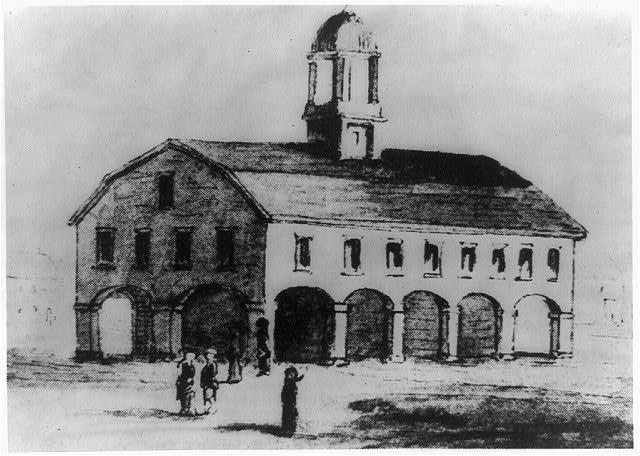
The Old Royal Exchange, in New York City, where the first meeting of the Court was held in February 1790, though with no cases to hear.

== Jay, Rutledge, and Ellsworth Courts (1789–1801) ==
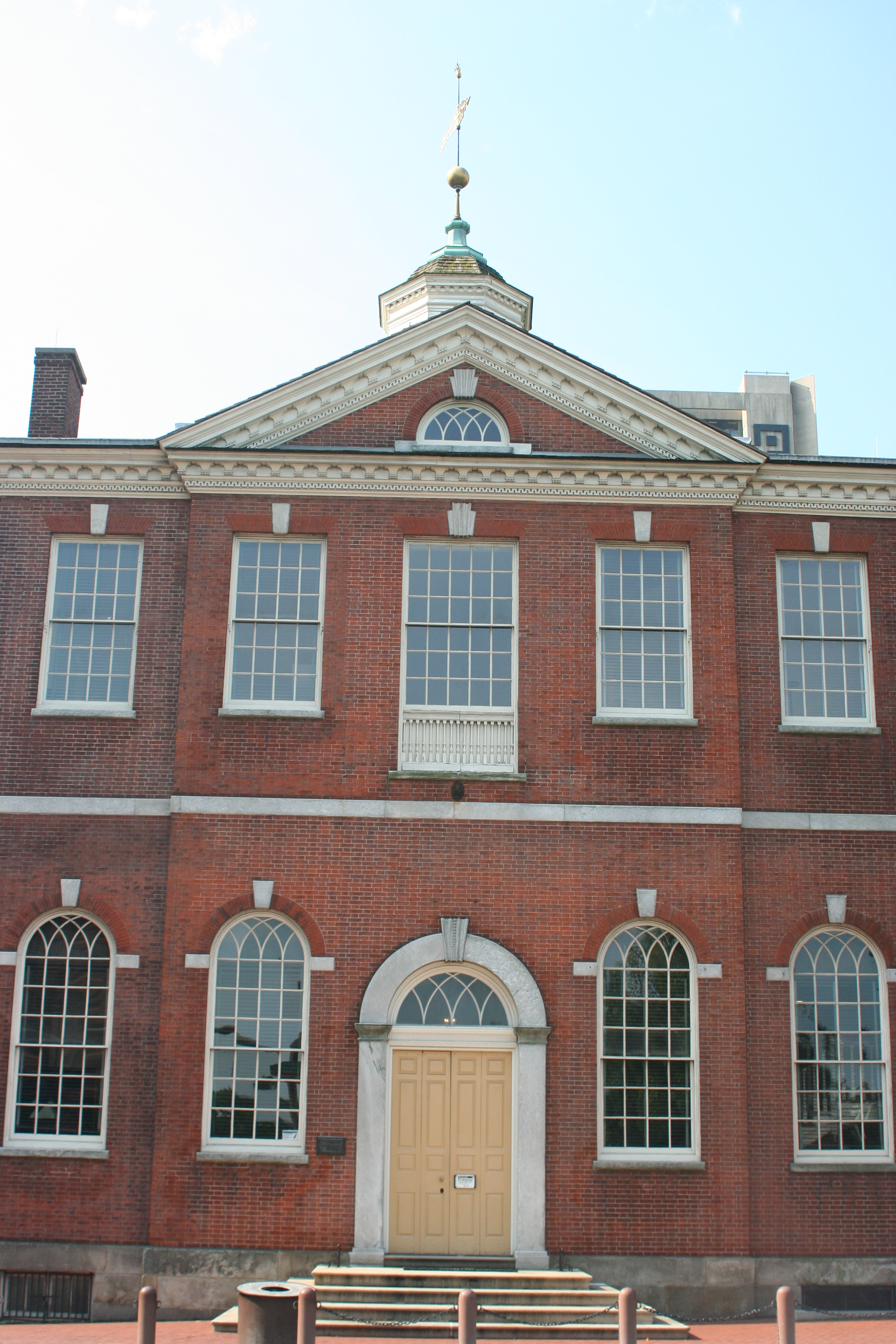
The Court lacked its own building until 1935; from 1791 to 1801, it met in Philadelphia's City Hall.

The first Chief Justice of the United States was John Jay; the Court's first docketed case was Van Staphorst v. Maryland (1791), and its first recorded decision was West v. Barnes (1791). Perhaps the most controversial of the Supreme Court's early decisions was Chisholm v. Georgia, in which it held that the federal judiciary could hear lawsuits against states. Soon thereafter, responding to the concerns of several states, Congress proposed the Eleventh Amendment, which granted states immunity from certain types of lawsuits in federal courts. The Amendment was ratified in 1795.

Jay was succeeded as Chief Justice by John Rutledge, and then by Oliver Ellsworth. No major cases came before the Supreme Court during this time.

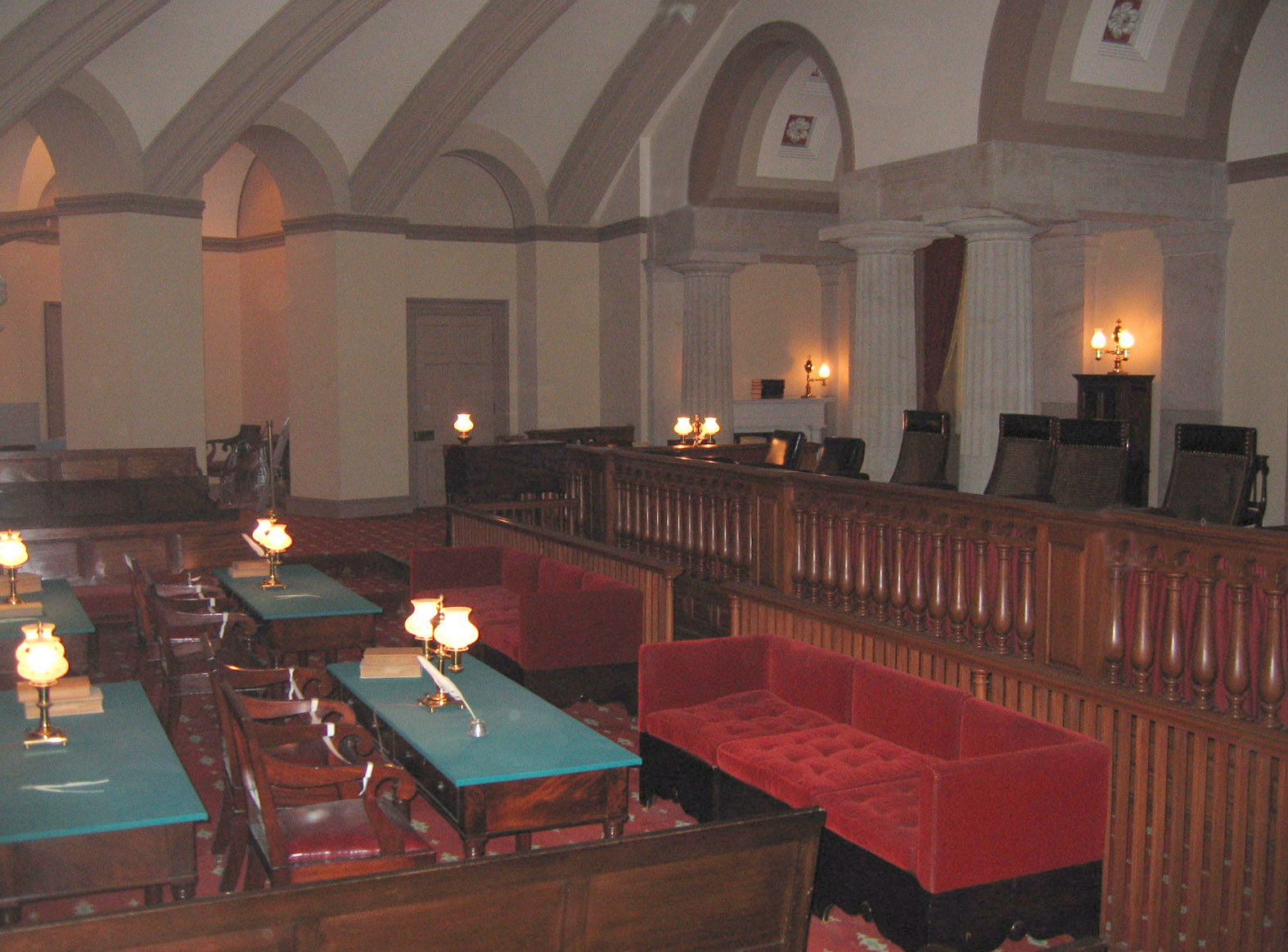
The Supreme Court met in windowless chambers in the Capitol from 1819 until 1860. The room has been restored and is now known as the Old Supreme Court Chamber.

== Marshall Court (1801–1835) ==
For intending to establish three departments, co-ordinate and independent, that they might check and balance one another, it has given, according to this opinion, to one of them alone, the right to prescribe rules for the government of the others, and to that one too, which is unelected by, and independent of the nation.

— Thomas Jefferson, about the Marshall Court

One of the most significant events during the history of the Court was the tenure of Chief Justice John Marshall (1801 to 1835). In the landmark case Marbury v. Madison (1803), Marshall held that the Supreme Court could overturn a law passed by Congress if it violated the Constitution, legally cementing the power of judicial review. The Marshall Court also made several important decisions relating to federalism. Marshall took a broad view of the powers of the federal government—in particular, the interstate commerce clause and the Necessary and Proper Clause. For instance, in McCulloch v. Maryland (1819), the Court ruled that the interstate commerce clause and other clauses permitted Congress to create a national bank, even though the power to create a bank is not explicitly mentioned in the Constitution. Similarly, in Gibbons v. Ogden (1824), the Court found that the interstate commerce clause permitted Congress to regulate interstate navigation.

The Marshall Court also made several decisions restraining the actions of state governments. The notion that the Supreme Court could consider appeals from state courts was established in Martin v. Hunter's Lessee (1816) and Cohens v. Virginia (1821). In several decisions, the Marshall Court confirmed the supremacy of federal laws over state laws. For example, in McCulloch, the Court held that a state could not tax an agency of the federal government. At the same time, however, the Marshall Court held in the landmark case Barron v. Baltimore (1833) that the Bill of Rights restricted the federal government alone, and did not apply to the states. Nonetheless, the Supreme Court would in later years hold that the Fourteenth Amendment had the effect of applying most provisions of the Bill of Rights to the states.

Marshall's forceful personality allowed him to steer his fellow justices; only once did he find himself on the losing side in a constitutional case. In that case (Ogden v. Saunders in 1827), Marshall set forth his general principles of constitutional interpretation:

To say that the intention of the instrument must prevail; that this intention must be collected from its words; that its words are to be understood in that sense in which they are generally used by those for whom the instrument was intended; that its provisions are neither to be restricted into insignificance, nor extended to objects not comprehended in them, nor contemplated by its framers; -- is to repeat what has been already said more at large, and all that can be necessary.

Marshall was in the dissenting minority only eight times throughout his tenure at the Court, partly because of his influence over the associate justices. As Oliver Wolcott observed when both he and Marshall served in the Adams administration, Marshall had the knack of "putting his own ideas into the minds of others, unconsciously to them". However, he regularly curbed his own viewpoints, preferring to arrive at decisions by consensus. He adjusted his role to accommodate other members of the court as they developed.

Marshall had charm, humor, a quick intelligence, and the ability to bring men together. His sincerity and presence commanded attention. His opinions were workmanlike but not especially eloquent or subtle. His influence on learned men of the law came from the charismatic force of his personality, and his ability to seize upon the key elements of a case and make highly persuasive arguments. Together with his vision of the future greatness of the nation, these qualities are apparent in his historic decisions and gave him the sobriquet, The Great Chief Justice.

Marshall ran a congenial court; there was seldom any bickering. The Court met in Washington only two months a year, from the first Monday in February through the second or third week in March. Six months of the year the justices did circuit duty in the various states. Marshall was therefore based in Richmond, his hometown, for most of the year. When the Court was in session in Washington, the justices boarded together in the same rooming house, avoided outside socializing, and discussed each case intently among themselves. Decisions were usually made in a matter of days. Marshall wrote nearly half the decisions during his 33 years in office. Lawyers appearing before the court, including the most brilliant in the United States, typically gave oral arguments and did not present written briefs. The justices did not have clerks, so they listened closely to the oral arguments and decided among themselves what the decision should be. The court issued only one decision; the occasional dissenter did not issue a separate opinion.

While Marshall was considered good at listening to the oral briefs and convincing the other justices of his interpretation of the law, he was not widely read in the law and seldom cited precedents. After the Court reached a decision, he would usually write it up himself. Often he asked Justice Story, a renowned legal scholar, to do the chore of locating precedents, saying, "There, Story; that is the law of this case; now go and find the authorities."

Marshall's tenure as chief justice has been associated with the shift towards black robes as court dress for Supreme Court judges. However, there is some evidence that indicates that the shift towards black robes occurred earlier.

== Taney Court (1836–1864) ==
In 1836, Marshall was succeeded as Chief Justice by Roger B. Taney, who had a somewhat more limited view of the powers of the federal government. At a time when sectional tensions between the North and South were high, many of the Supreme Court's decisions—particularly those relating to slavery—met with controversy and contention. Most controversial was the Taney Court's decision in Dred Scott v. Sandford (1857). Dred Scott, a slave from Missouri, sued for his freedom on the grounds that his master had taken him into Illinois and the territory of Wisconsin, both of which prohibited slavery, for extended periods of time. Taney, however, ruled that members of the African race were not and could never become citizens of the United States. Consequently, he ruled that Scott therefore had no standing to file the lawsuit. Moreover, he held that the Missouri Compromise, under which Congress prohibited slavery in certain territories that formed part of the Louisiana Purchase, was unconstitutional. The controversial decision met with outrage from abolitionists, and contributed to the tensions that led to the Civil War during the next decade. In 1863, the Tenth Circuit Act expanded the Court to ten justices, with Stephen Johnson Field taking the tenth position.

== Chase, Waite, and Fuller Courts (1864–1910) ==
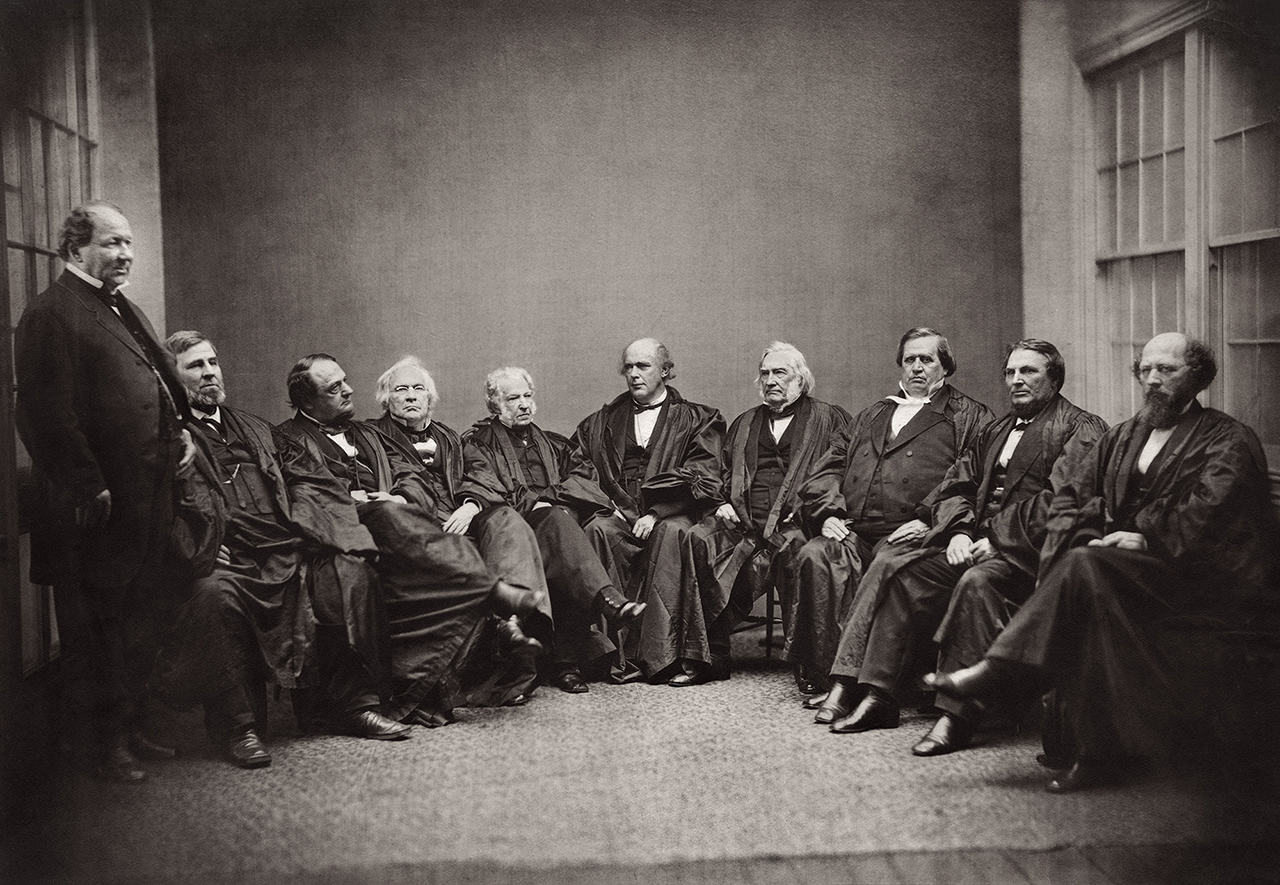
First photograph of the U.S. Supreme Court, by Alexander Gardner, 1867.

In the midst of the Civil War in 1864, Abraham Lincoln appointed Salmon P. Chase to replace Roger Taney as Chief Justice. Chase had strong anti-slavery credentials and had previously served Lincoln as Secretary of the Treasury. His post-Civil War tenure featured several key decisions affirming the indestructibility of the Union. A prototypical example of this is the 1869 case Texas v. White, in which the court held that Texas had legally remained a state during the Civil War and that in fact all claims of secession were legally null because the Constitution did not permit states to secede and had no procedure for states to do so. Chase was considered highly ambitious, even for a politician. In 1872, Chase ran for the Presidency while serving on the Supreme Court, but his efforts were ultimately unsuccessful. Chase continued to serve as Chief Justice until his death in 1873, after which he was replaced by the Ulysses S. Grant-nominated Morrison Waite. Waite in turn served as Chief Justice until his death in 1888, and was replaced by the Grover Cleveland-nominated Melville Fuller.

Following President Lincoln's 1865 assassination, the Republican-dominated Congress determined to deny Democratic president Andrew Johnson the opportunity to fill any Supreme Court seats. Pursuant to this goal, it passed the Judicial Circuits Act of 1866, which would have provided for the gradual elimination of seats as justices retired until reaching a membership of seven justices from the previous ten. John Catron had died in 1865 prior to the passage of the Judicial Circuits Act, and Johnson's then-pending nomination of Henry Stanbery to Catron's position was nullified by the act, which left the court with a membership of nine. James Moore Wayne died in 1867, and the abolishment of his seat left the court with a membership of eight. With Johnson leaving office in 1869, Congress passed the Judiciary Act of 1869, increasing the membership of the court back to nine. As of 2026, the court's size has since remained constant at nine members notwithstanding deaths and resignations.

In the aftermath of the Civil War, Congress passed and the states ratified the Fourteenth Amendment, which, among other things, prevented states from abridging the "privileges and immunities of citizens," from denying due process of law, and from denying equal protection of the laws to any person. Many cases that came before the Court in the post–Civil War era involved interpretation of the Fourteenth Amendment. In the Civil Rights Cases (1883), the Court under Chief Justice Morrison Waite held that Congress could not prohibit racial discrimination by private individuals (as opposed to governments) on the grounds of the Fourteenth Amendment. Later, in Plessy v. Ferguson (1896), the Court under Chief Justice Melville Fuller determined that the equal protection clause did not prohibit racial segregation in public facilities, as long as the facilities were equal (giving rise to the infamous term "separate but equal"). The sole dissenter in that case was John Marshall Harlan.

== White and Taft courts (1910–1930) ==
In the early twentieth century, the Supreme Court established that the Fourteenth Amendment protected the "liberty of contract." On the grounds of the Fourteenth Amendment and other provisions of the Constitution, it controversially overturned many state and federal laws designed to protect employees. The first important decision of the era was Lochner v. New York (1905), in which the Court overturned a New York law limiting the number of hours bakers could work each week. In Adair v. United States (1908), the Court overruled a federal law which forbade "yellow dog contracts" (contracts that prohibited workers from joining unions). Adkins v. Children's Hospital (1923) involved a decision that a District of Columbia minimum wage law was unconstitutional.

In 1925, the Supreme Court made a landmark ruling in Gitlow v. New York, establishing the doctrine of incorporation, under which provisions of the Bill of Rights were deemed to restrict the states. Originally, as Chief Justice John Marshall ruled in Barron v. Baltimore (1833), the Bill of Rights restricted only the federal government; however, during the twentieth century, the Supreme Court held in a series of decisions the Fourteenth Amendment had the effect of applying some (but not all) provisions of the Bill of Rights to the states. The first such decision was Gitlow, in which the Supreme Court incorporated the protection of freedom of speech afforded by the First Amendment. Important decisions relating to incorporations were made during later decades, especially the 1960s.

== Hughes, Stone, and Vinson Courts (1930–1953) ==
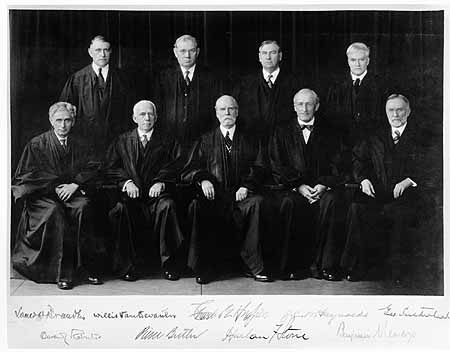
U.S. Supreme Court, 1932.

During the 1930s, the Supreme Court contained both a solid liberal bloc and a solid conservative bloc. The four conservative Justices, known as "The Four Horsemen," were James McReynolds, George Sutherland, Willis Van Devanter and Pierce Butler. Their liberal opponents on the bench – Louis Brandeis, Benjamin Cardozo and Harlan Stone, were conversely known "The Three Musketeers", while Chief Justice Charles Evans Hughes and Justice Owen Roberts controlled the balance by serving as the swing votes. Hughes, as a progressive Republican, tended to side with the Three Musketeers, whilst Roberts was swayed to the side of the conservatives.

As a result, the Court continued to enforce a Federal laissez-faire approach, overturning many of President Franklin D. Roosevelt's New Deal programs, which were designed to combat the Great Depression, by 5–4 margins. Most notably, the National Industrial Recovery Act was overturned unanimously in Schechter Poultry Corp. v. United States (1935), and the Agricultural Adjustment Act was struck down in United States v. Butler (1936).

In response, President Roosevelt proposed the Judiciary Reorganization Bill (called the "court-packing bill" by its opponents) in 1937, which would have increased the size of the Supreme Court and permitted the appointment of an additional justice for each incumbent justice who reached the age of 70 years and 6 months and refused retirement; under Roosevelt's proposal, such appointments would continue until the Court reached a maximum size of 15 justices. Ostensibly, the proposal was made to ease the burdens of the docket on the elderly justices, but Roosevelt's actual purpose was to pack the Court with justices who would support his New Deal policies and legislation. The plan quickly drew bipartisan opposition, including from Roosevelt's own vice president John Nance Garner, and it failed in Congress.

Soon afterward, however, the ideological balance of the Supreme Court that had prevailed since Lochner began to shift. Justice Roberts, who had previously voted with the conservative bloc in invalidating New Deal legislation, began to vote on the opposite side. Roberts' decision spelled the end of the Lochner era and has been dubbed the "switch in time that saved nine." The balance of the Court shifted with the retirement of Justice Van Devanter 1937 and of Justice Sutherland the following year, while Justice Butler died in November 1939. By the end of 1941, Roosevelt had appointed seven Supreme Court justices and elevated Harlan Fiske Stone to chief justice.

The Hughes and Stone Courts overturned many convictions of African-Americans in southern courts, most notably in Powell v. Alabama (1932), and laid the groundwork for postwar school desegregation in Missouri ex rel. Gaines v. Canada (1938). In one of the last cases under Chief Justice Hughes – United States v. Classic – the Court would rule that the white primaries of eight former Confederate states could be regulated as general elections were. This was followed up three years later by the landmark Smith v. Allwright (1944) which outlawed white primaries entirely and paved the way for the first significant increases in black voter registration and voting in former Confederate states since their virtually complete disenfranchisement in the 1890s.

Between 1943 and 1946, eight of the nine sitting justices had been appointed by President Roosevelt, the sole exceptions being Owen Roberts and his replacement Harold Hitz Burton. After Stone died, Fred M. Vinson was appointed Chief Justice by Harry S. Truman.

== Warren Court (1953–1969) ==
In 1953, President Dwight David Eisenhower appointed Earl Warren, who was then governor of California, to the position of Chief Justice. Warren's term, which lasted until 1969, was arguably one of the most significant in the history of the Court. Under him, the Court made a long series of landmark decisions. Notable members of the liberal wing of the Court aside from Warren included Hugo Black, William O. Douglas (the longest-serving Justice in the Court's history) and William J. Brennan. The foremost conservative members of the Court were Felix Frankfurter and John Marshall Harlan II (grandson of the first Justice Harlan). The first important case of Warren's tenure was Brown v. Board of Education (1954), in which the Court unanimously declared segregation in public schools unconstitutional, effectively reversing the precedent set earlier in Plessy v. Ferguson and other cases.

The Warren Court also made several controversial decisions relating to the Bill of Rights. The doctrine of incorporation, which had first taken root in Gitlow v. New York, was applied fully to most provisions of the Bill of Rights. In Engel v. Vitale (1962), the Court declared that officially sanctioned prayer in public schools was unconstitutional under the First Amendment. Similarly, in Abington School District v. Schempp (1963), it struck down mandatory Bible readings in public schools. The Court also expanded and incorporated the rights of criminal defendants, on the basis of the Fourth, Fifth, and Sixth Amendments. In Mapp v. Ohio (1961), the Court incorporated the Fourth Amendment and ruled that illegally seized evidence could not be used in a trial. Gideon v. Wainwright (1963) established that states were required to provide attorneys to indigent defendants. Miranda v. Arizona (1966) held that the police must inform suspects of their rights (including the right to remain silent and the right to an attorney) before being interrogated. (The decision is the source of the famous Miranda warning.) Another significant and controversial decision made by the Warren Court was Griswold v. Connecticut (1965), which established that the Constitution protected the right to privacy.

== Burger Court (1969–1986) ==
Chief Justice Earl Warren was succeeded by Warren E. Burger, who served from 1969 to 1986. The Burger Court is best remembered for its ruling in Roe v. Wade (1973), which held that there is a constitutionally protected right to have an abortion in some circumstances. The Court also made important decisions relating to the First Amendment. In Lemon v. Kurtzman (1971), it established the "Lemon test" for determining if legislation violates the establishment clause. Similarly, it established the "Miller test" for laws banning obscenity in Miller v. California (1973).

Other rulings include Landmark Communications v. Virginia in which the court ruled for fining a newspaper for revealing the identity of a judge under investigation by state commissioner H. Warrington Sharp. The Burger Court also established a moratorium on capital punishment in Furman v. Georgia (1972), holding that states generally awarded death sentences arbitrarily and inconsistently. The moratorium, however, was lifted four years later in Gregg v. Georgia (1976). Also in United States v. Nixon (1974), the court ruled that the courts have the final voice in determining constitutional questions and that no person, not even the President of the United States, is completely above law.

The Burger Court largely affirmed the Warren Court's rulings, as the liberal bloc was still led by Justices William J. Brennan, Thurgood Marshall, and John Paul Stevens. Meanwhile, Justice William Rehnquist led the conservative bloc. Many justices during this era were considered to be moderate and did not necessarily push the law in a more conservative or liberal direction.

== Rehnquist Court (1986–2005) ==
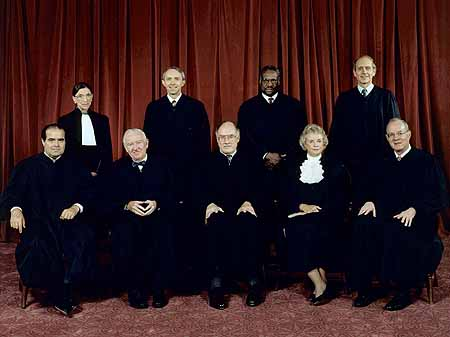
U.S. Supreme Court, 1998.

Chief Justice William Rehnquist served from Burger's retirement in 1986 until his own death on September 3, 2005. The Rehnquist Court generally took a limited view of Congress's powers under the commerce clause, as exemplified by United States v. Lopez (1995). The Court made numerous controversial decisions, including Texas v. Johnson (1989), which declared that flag burning was a form of speech protected by the First Amendment; Lee v. Weisman (1992), which declared officially sanctioned, student-led school prayers unconstitutional; Stenberg v. Carhart (2000), which voided laws prohibiting late-term abortions; and Lawrence v. Texas (2003), which struck down laws prohibiting sodomy. (Some commentators see these decisions as part of the "culture wars.") Another controversial decision of the Rehnquist court in 2003 was Grutter v. Bollinger which upheld affirmative action. Perhaps the most controversial decision made by the Court came in Bush v. Gore (2000), which ended election recounts in Florida following the presidential election of 2000, allowing George W. Bush to become the forty-third U.S. President.

Rehnquist led a remarkably stable Court. For the eleven years following when Stephen Breyer took the oath in 1994, to Rehnquist's death in 2005, the composition of the Court remained unchanged – the longest such stretch in over 180 years.

Justices Ruth Bader Ginsburg and John Paul Stevens led the Court's liberal bloc during this era. Meanwhile, Justices Antonin Scalia and Clarence Thomas joined Chief Justice Rehnquist as the Court's conservative bloc. Justices Sandra Day O'Connor and Anthony Kennedy were considered "swing votes" in the middle of the court, though Kennedy would protest that "the cases swing".

== Roberts Court (2005–present) ==
Chief Justice John G. Roberts was confirmed by the United States Senate on September 29, 2005, and presided over the Court for the first time on October 3, 2005, the day the 2005–2006 session opened. On October 31, 2005, President George W. Bush nominated Samuel Alito to replace the retiring Justice Sandra Day O'Connor (who Roberts was originally going to replace), and was confirmed on January 31, 2006. Under Roberts the Court has drifted primarily to the right in areas like the death penalty (Kansas v. Marsh), abortion (Gonzales v. Carhart and Dobbs v. Jackson Women's Health Organization), the exclusionary rule for Fourth Amendment violations (Hudson v. Michigan), and campaign-finance regulation (Citizens United v. Federal Election Commission). On November 20, 2007, the Court agreed to hear a case, District of Columbia v. Heller, that was regarded as the first important and historically significant decision on the Second Amendment to the Constitution since 1875. On March 18, 2008, the Supreme Court heard arguments concerning the constitutionality of a District of Columbia ban on handguns. On June 26, 2008, the Supreme Court ruled that "The Second Amendment protects an individual right to possess a firearm unconnected with service in a militia, and to use that arm for traditionally lawful purposes, such as self-defense within the home."

On August 8, 2009, Sonia Sotomayor became the first Hispanic-American to serve on the Supreme Court after being nominated by Barack Obama and confirmed by the Senate to replace the retiring Justice David Souter. On May 10, 2010, President Obama nominated Elena Kagan to replace the retiring Justice John Paul Stevens. She was confirmed on August 7, 2010. On January 31, 2017, President Donald Trump nominated Neil Gorsuch to replace the late Justice Antonin Scalia (who died on February 13, 2016), and he was confirmed on April 7, 2017. On July 9, 2018, President Trump nominated Brett Kavanaugh to replace the retiring Justice Anthony Kennedy. He was confirmed on October 6, 2018.

On March 16, 2020, the Supreme Court announced it would postpone oral arguments in response to the COVID-19 pandemic, disrupting its operation for the first time in 102 years. Six months later on September 18, Ruth Bader Ginsburg died at the age of 87, opening up a seat in the Supreme Court. President Donald Trump nominated Amy Coney Barrett as a replacement on September 26, 2020, less than two months before the 2020 general election. She was confirmed by the Senate in a 52–48 vote on October 26, 2020, eight days prior to the same election. On June 30, 2022, Stephen Breyer retired, and Ketanji Brown Jackson, who had already been confirmed on April 7, 2022 by a 53–47 vote, was sworn in as his replacement.

Justice Ruth Bader Ginsburg led the liberal bloc during much of this court, while Justices Antonin Scalia and Clarence Thomas led the conservative bloc. Chief Justice Roberts and Justice Anthony Kennedy were considered to be in the "middle" of the court.

On November 13, 2023, for the first time in its history the court issued a Code of Conduct for Justices of the Supreme Court of the United States to set "ethics rules and principles that guide the conduct of the Members of the Court."
