= William Bradford (Attorney General) =

American judge and lawyer (1755–1795)

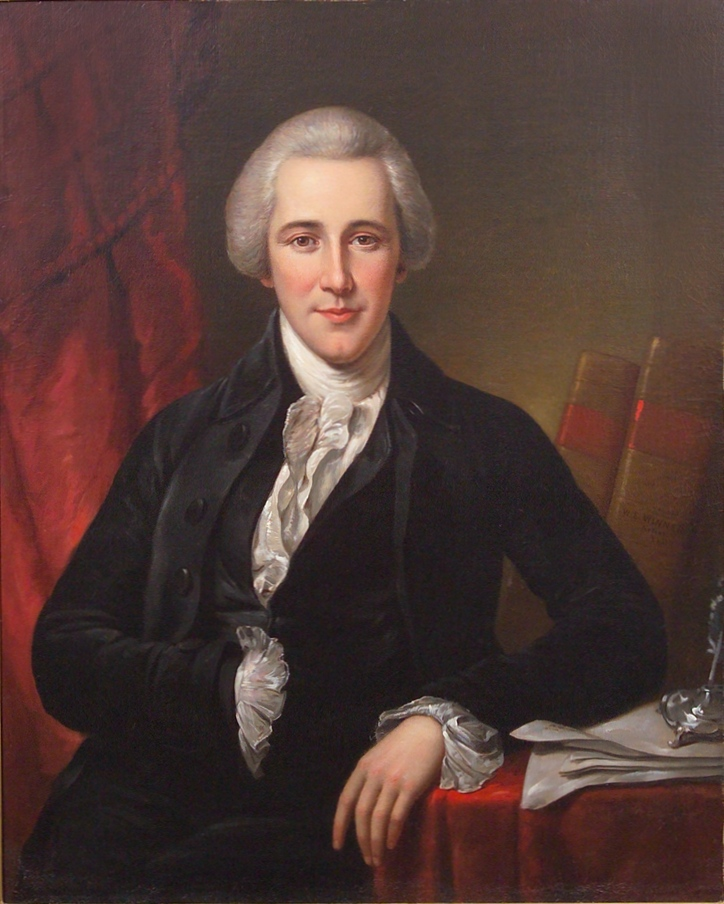

2nd United States Attorney General
- In office January 27, 1794 – August 23, 1795
- President: George Washington
- Preceded by: Edmund Randolph
- Succeeded by: Charles Lee

Associate Justice of Pennsylvania Supreme Court
- In office August 22, 1791 – January 27, 1794
- Governor: Thomas Mifflin
- Preceded by: George Bryan
- Succeeded by: Thomas Smith

Attorney General of Pennsylvania
- In office November 23, 1780 – August 20, 1791
- Governor: Joseph Reed; William Moore; John Dickinson; Benjamin Franklin; Thomas Mifflin
- Preceded by: Jonathan Dickinson Sergeant
- Succeeded by: Jared Ingersoll

Personal details
- Born: September 14, 1755 Philadelphia, Pennsylvania, British America
- Died: August 23, 1795 (aged 39) Washington D.C., U.S.
- Party: Federalist
- Spouse: Susan Vergereau Boudinot (m. 1784)
- Education: Princeton University (BA)

Military service
- Branch/service: Pennsylvania Militia; Continental Army
- Years of service: 1776-1779
- Rank: Lieutenant Colonel
- Unit: 11th Pennsylvania Regiment
- Battles/wars: American Revolutionary War; Battle of Trenton

William Bradford (September 14, 1755 – August 23, 1795) was an American lawyer and judge from Philadelphia, Pennsylvania, and the second United States Attorney General in 1794–1795.

== Early life ==
He was the son of the printer William Bradford and was born in Philadelphia. He began his education at the Academy of Philadelphia, then attended Princeton University, where he formed a lifelong friendship with Virginian James Madison, before graduating in 1772. When he returned to Philadelphia he read law with Edward Shippen. His progress was delayed by the American Revolutionary War.

== Military career ==
In 1776, when the Pennsylvania militia was called out, William volunteered as a private. Later that year, the militia was organized into a "flying camp" with Daniel Roberdeau as the first brigadier general in the states forces. General Roberdeau chose the young man as an aide, and later promoted him to brigade major on his headquarters staff.

When his militia term expired, he joined the Continental Army as a captain and company commander in the 11th Pennsylvania Regiment commanded by Richard Hampton. By the end of the year, he saw action in the Battle of Trenton. While at Morristown, New Jersey, he was named a deputy to the muster master-general on April 10, 1777, and he was promoted to lieutenant colonel. During the encampment at Valley Forge in late 1777 and early 1778, his headquarters was at the David Havard House. He resigned after two years due to ill health and returned home in early 1779.

== Legal career ==
Bradford joined the bar before the Pennsylvania Supreme Court in September 1779. He was named as the state's Attorney General in 1780, and served until 1791. In 1784, he married Susan Vergereau Boudinot, the only daughter of Elias Boudinot. The following year, 1785, Bradford was elected a member of the American Philosophical Society. On August 2, 1791 Bradford represented General William West and argued the first recorded case before the U.S. Supreme Court, West v. Barnes losing the decision.

=== State Supreme Court Justice ===
On August 22, 1791, Bradford was appointed to the Supreme Court of Pennsylvania, and served for three years. In 1793, Governor Thomas Mifflin asked his help to reduce the use of the death penalty. His report to the legislature was in the form of an essay, "An Inquiry how far the Punishment of Death is Necessary in Pennsylvania". In the next reorganization of Pennsylvania's penal code, the use of capital punishment was substantially reduced. Other states followed the Pennsylvania example.

=== Attorney General ===
On January 8, 1794, George Washington named him Attorney General for the United States to replace Edmund Randolph. He served as Attorney General from January 27, 1794 to August 23, 1795.

== Death and legacy ==
He died while in office as Attorney General in 1795. He was buried with his wife's family in Saint Mary's Episcopal Churchyard in Burlington, New Jersey. A cenotaph for Bradford was built at his family's burial plot in Laurel Hill Cemetery in Philadelphia.

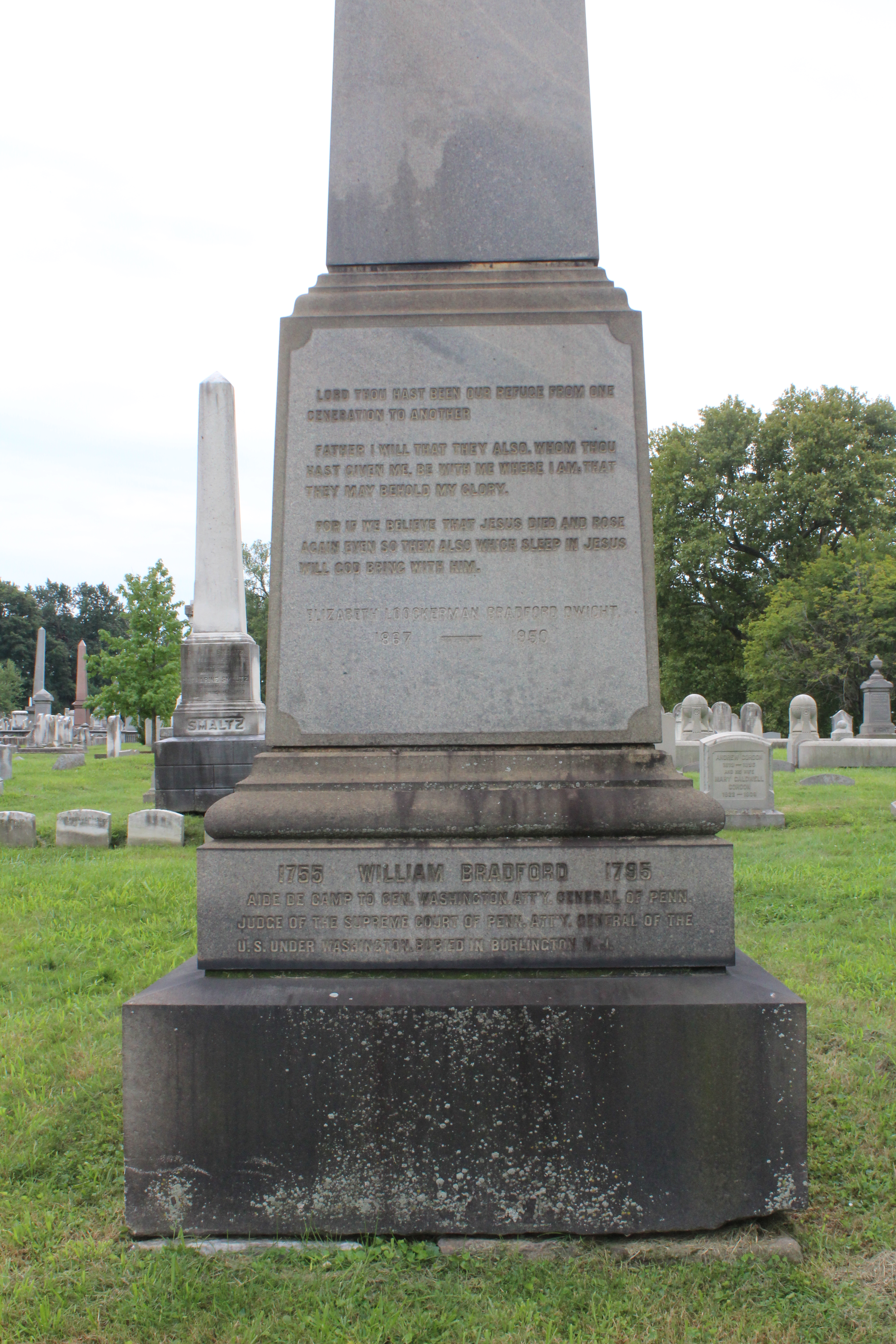
William Bradford Cenotaph in Laurel Hill Cemetery. He is buried at his wife's family plot at Saint Mary's Episcopal Churchyard in Burlington, New Jersey

Bradford County, Pennsylvania, was named in his honor.

Legal offices
Preceded by Jonathan Dickinson Sergeant	Pennsylvania Attorney General; 1780–1791	Succeeded by Jared Ingersoll
Preceded by Edmund Randolph	United States Attorney General; 1794–1795	Succeeded by Charles Lee
