= Collet v. Collet =

- Supreme Court of the United States
- Full case name: Collet v. Collet
- Citations: 2 U.S. 294 (more) 2 Dall. 294; 1 L. Ed. 387

Holding
- None settled

Case opinion
- Majority: None

Collet v. Collet, 2 U.S. (2 Dall.) 294 (C.C.D. Pa. 1792), was a Supreme Court of the United States decision that was the earliest appellate case docketed although it was never heard by the Court. Van Staphorst v. Maryland was the first case docketed with the court. West v. Barnes was the first case decided by the court.

Collet originated as an assumpsit case in Pennsylvania state court, but eventually came to the federal Circuit Court in Philadelphia where the Circuit Court ruled that Congress' power of naturalization was concurrent with the state's. Collet obtained a writ of error but dropped the case before reaching the Supreme Court.
