= Court of Appeals in Cases of Capture =

United States federal court (1780–1788)

- Established: January 15, 1780
- Dissolved: June 21, 1788
- Jurisdiction: United States
- Location: Various locations within the United States
- Composition method: Selection by the Continental Congress
- Authorized by: Statute enacted by the Continental Congress
- Appeals to: None available
- Number of positions: 3

The former Court of Appeals in Cases of Capture, established by resolution of the Continental Congress on January 15, 1780, was the first federal court in the United States. The court had jurisdiction over cases for the capture of enemy ships and cargo.

== Origin ==
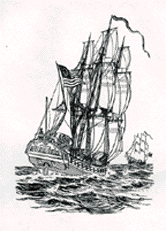
During the American Revolution, the United States issued letters of marque and reprisal authorizing private vessels, known as privateers, to capture enemy ships and cargo as prizes.

The idea for the court originated from requests sent by General George Washington during the American Revolution to President of Congress John Hancock, but initially resulted in only the establishment of committees within Congress to exercise such jurisdiction. Upon learning of this deviation from his earlier requests, Washington sent another request to Hancock again asking that Congress establish the court, but Congress did not fulfill his request until almost four years later.

== Authority for establishment ==
Although specific express power to establish the Court was granted to Congress in the Articles of Confederation, the Articles of Confederation were not yet fully ratified by all thirteen of the original states when Congress established the Court on January 15, 1780. However, the U.S. Supreme Court ruled that Congress nonetheless had inherent power at that time to establish the Court.

== Duration ==
The Court operated from shortly after its founding in 1780 through its final cases in 1787. It officially ceased to exist following ratification of the U.S. Constitution in 1789 that transferred federal judicial power to the newly created U.S. Supreme Court and such other inferior (i.e., lower) federal courts as Congress may establish.

== Jurisdiction ==
Beginning with Massachusetts on November 1, 1775, several of the American colonies (and, later, states) established prize courts to exercise original jurisdiction over all cases (or libels) of captures (or prizes) consisting of enemy ships and cargo. Establishment of such courts was recommended by Congress on November 25, 1775.

On November 25, 1775, Congress also asserted federal appellate jurisdiction over such cases. After repeated scheduling difficulties when Congress attempted to hear the first appeal, Congress initially assigned that jurisdiction to various special committees, followed by a standing committee on January 30, 1777.

Later, on January 15, 1780, Congress established the Court of Appeals in Cases of Capture to exercise that jurisdiction as a court of last resort. On May 24, 1780, Congress transferred all remaining appeals pending before committees to the Court and specified that all future appeals were to be filed directly with the Court.

On June 27, 1786, the Court's jurisdiction was again expanded to include rehearings and new trials in certain cases wherever justice so required.

Special jurisdiction was also conferred upon the Court on February 11, 1782 for a capture adjudicated by a prize court in Connecticut and on July 24, 1786 for a capture of the sloop Chester.

== Times and locations of sessions ==
The first session of the Court was required to be held in Philadelphia, Pennsylvania at the earliest opportunity. Subsequent sessions were to be held at other times and locations in the United States as deemed conducive to the public good, but no farther east than Hartford, Connecticut, and no farther south than Williamsburg, Virginia. Congress later specified the time and location for some sessions of the Court, including specific sessions to be held at Hartford, Connecticut; Philadelphia, Pennsylvania; Richmond, Virginia; and New York, New York.

== Procedure ==
The primary means of initiating an appeal to the Court required a party to first demand an appeal in the trial court within five days after definitive sentence and then file an appeal in and give adequate security to the Court within forty days after demanding an appeal in the trial court. On Sept. 5, 1781, an extension of time for appeal was granted in the case of a capture decided in favor of Patrick Mahon against Roger Kean. Additionally, some appeals filed with Congress and referred to committees were subsequently transferred to the Court.

Trial by jury was considered inconsistent with the usage of nations, and, therefore, was not authorized in the Court. However, trial by jury was authorized in some of the state prize courts, where Congress initially recommended it, only to later recommend against it.

In any case before the Court that involved a capture suspected of being collusive, the Court was required to demand sufficient proof to the contrary from the captor, and if the captor failed to meet that burden, the Court was required to award the prize to the state in which the original trial had been held.

== Judges ==
The Court was composed of three judges, but a quorum required the presence of only two judges.

All judges serving on the Court were first required to take the following oath of office administered before the President of Congress:

You do swear [or affirm] that you will well, faithfully and impartially execute the office of one of the judges of the Court of Appeals in Cases of Capture, according to the best of your skill and judgment. So help you God.

Initially, the judges received annual salaries for their services with reimbursement for expenses, but their compensation was later changed to provide for only fixed daily rates, including time spent traveling on official business of the Court.

The following individuals were elected by Congress to serve as judges on the Court:

- William Paca (elected Jan. 22, 1780; accepted Feb. 8, 1780; resigned November 21, 1782).
- Titus Hosmer (elected Jan. 22, 1780; accepted April 12, 1780; died in office Aug. 4, 1780).
- George Wythe (elected Jan. 22, 1780; declined to serve Feb. 21, 1780).
- Cyrus Griffin (elected April 28, 1780; accepted May 4, 1780).
- George Read (elected Dec. 5, 1782; accepted Dec. 10, 1782).
- John Lowell (elected Dec. 5, 1782; accepted Feb. 12, 1783).

As judges on the Court, George Read had seniority over John Lowell based on the results of an election in Congress held on Dec. 13, 1782.

== Cases ==
Surviving records show that a total of fifty-six cases were lodged with and adjudicated or otherwise disposed of by the Court, including eleven cases that were transferred from committees within Congress to the Court.

Although the Court did not generally issue formal written opinions of its decisions, opinions of the Court were nonetheless published in the following cases:

- The Resolution, 2 U.S. (2 Dall.) 1 (Ct. App. in Cases of Capture 1781).
- The Resolution, 2 U.S. (2 Dall.) 19 (Ct. App. in Cases of Capture 1781) (rehearing).
- The Erstern, 2 U.S. (2 Dall.) 34 (Ct. App. in Cases of Capture 1782).
- The Gloucester, 2 U.S. (2 Dall.) 36 (Ct. App. in Cases of Capture 1782).
- The Squirrel, 2 U.S. (2 Dall.) 40 (Ct. App. in Cases of Capture 1783) (authorized sale of ship to avoid deterioration; proceeds from sale remained subject to adjudication).
- The Speedwell, 2 U.S. (2 Dall.) 40 (Ct. App. in Cases of Capture 1784) (reversed condemnation because capture occurred after preliminary articles of peace).
- Luke v. Hulbert, 2 Dall. *41 (Ct. App. in Cases of Capture 1787) (dismissed) (using star pagination from 1st ed.).
- The Experiment v. The Chester, 2 Dall. *41 (Ct. App. in Cases of Capture 1787) (dismissed) (using star pagination from 1st ed.).

Custody of records from the Court was first transferred to the U.S. Supreme Court. However, the National Archives now maintains custody of the records. Under the terms of 28 USC §6, the Archives treat the court's records "in the manner provided by law for giving copies of the records and proceedings of the Supreme Court," and "such copies shall have the same faith and credit as proceedings of the Supreme Court.

== See also ==
- Federal judiciary of the United States
- Prize court
- Prize (law)
- Letter of marque
- Privateer
- Second Continental Congress
- American Revolutionary War

== Sources ==
- J.C. Bancroft Davis, Federal Courts Prior to the Adoption of the Constitution, in 131 U.S. app. at xix-–lxiii (New York and Albany, Banks & Brothers 1889).
- George Washington, Letters, in 3 The Writings of George Washington, 1775–1776, (Worthington Chauncey Ford, New York and London, G. P. Putnam's Sons 1889).
- Cont'l Cong., Journal and Records, in Journals of the Continental Congress, 1774–1789 (Library of Cong. eds., 1904–1937).
