= Georgia v. Brailsford =

Georgia v. Brailsford is the name of three decisions of the Supreme Court of the United States:

- Georgia v. Brailsford (1792) 2 U.S. 402, involving state rights to collect debt from foreign citizens
- Georgia v. Brailsford (1793) 2 U.S. 415, continuing the case of Georgia v. Brailsford (1792)
- Georgia v. Brailsford (1794) 3 U.S. 1, concluding the case for the defendants
