= Georgia v. Brailsford (1793) =

- Supreme Court of the United States

Decided February 7, 1793
- Full case name: The State of Georgia v. Brailsford, et al.
- Citations: 2 U.S. 415 (more) 2 Dall. 415

Court membership
- Chief Justice John Jay Associate Justices James Wilson · William Cushing; John Blair Jr. · James Iredell

Case opinions
- Majority: Jay, joined by Wilson, Cushing
- Dissent: Iredell
- Dissent: Blair

Georgia v. Brailsford, 2 U.S. (2 Dall.) 415 (1793), was a United States Supreme Court case continuing the case of Georgia v. Brailsford (1792). Here, the court held that "upon a motion to dissolve that injunction, this court held that, if the state of Georgia had the title in the debt, (upon which no opinion was then expressed,) she had an adequate remedy at law by action upon the bond; but, in order that the money might be kept for the party to whom it belonged, ordered the injunction to be continued till the next term, and, if Georgia should not then have instituted her action at common law, to be dissolved."

== See also ==
- Georgia v. Brailsford (disambiguation)
- Georgia v. Brailsford (1794)
- List of United States Supreme Court cases, volume 2
