= Oswald v. New York =

- Supreme Court of the United States

Decided February 14, 1792
- Full case name: Oswald, Administrator v. The State of New York
- Citations: 2 U.S. 401 (more) 2 Dall. 401; 1 L. Ed. 433; 1792 U.S. LEXIS 587

Holding
- Default judgment against New York

Court membership
- Chief Justice John Jay Associate Justices James Wilson · William Cushing; John Blair Jr. · James Iredell

Oswald v. New York, 2 U.S. (2 Dall.) 401 (1792), was a United States Supreme Court case in which an individual sued a state.

No appearance was entered for the defendant state and default judgment was rendered against the state. This remains the only case decided by the U.S. Supreme Court in which a citizen of a different state brought suit against a state where the state paid damages and court costs after a jury trial.

== Background ==
The origins of the case begin with John Holt, editor and writer whose printing presses were seized by the British for violating the Stamp Act. Following the seizure of his servants and presses, Holt received the assistance of George Clinton and Philip Schuyler and opened the New-York Journal. In 1777 Holt was then hired by the State of New York through the Committee of Safety chaired by John Jay. The Committee authorized the payment of £200 for one year. Despite no other resolution being passed, Holt continued to serve as the state printer for laws and resolutions until his death in 1784.

In this case the primary question was of payment for work performed. As late as 1783, Holt complained to the New York Senate about not being paid his annual salary. While no annual salary had been authorized and some work had been paid for by the State of New York, Holt argued that he was due funds that were not paid and he was forced to cease publication of his newspaper. Upon Holt’s death, his widow Elizabeth Holt filed a claim with the New York State Auditor in the amount of £5,293 for salary and expenses as state printer. Upon review of the claim, the auditor paid £2,000 for expenses but denied the claim for salary noting that the work performed after the first year was performed in lieu of salary. Mrs. Holt pressed her claim to the legislature which also denied the claim. Following this, she sold the newspaper and moved to Philadelphia with her daughter and son-in-law Eleazer Oswald.

When Elizabeth Holt died in 1788, her son-in-law, Eleazer Oswald then renewed the claim against the State of New York. Again presenting the case to Assembly, no relief was provided despite an attempt by the legislature to review the issue. With no relief from the legislature, Oswald filed suit in the U.S. Supreme Court in February 1791 seeking $31,458.35 in salary and damages.

== Proceedings ==
Following the filing of the case, summons were dispatched to Governor George Clinton and New York Attorney General Aaron Burr. Governor Clinton referred the summons to the New York Assembly which failed to act or respond. A second summons was issued by the court in February 1792. In February 1793, when New York again failed to respond, Oswald's attorney requested a default be entered at the August session if the state again failed to appear.

During the Fall Term of the court, attorney Jared Ingersoll appeared on behalf of the State of New York and filed a protest that the Court did not have jurisdiction over the case. Before the motion was heard by the court, Oswald's attorney requested a postponement of the case. Before the resumption of the case at the next session, politics intervened. The New York General Assembly came under control of the Federalists who were in an ongoing battle with Governor Clinton and the Anti-Federalists.

== Opinion of the Court ==
Dallas records the case as follows:

Oswald, Administrator v. the State of New York

February Term, 1792

Summons. In this case the Marshall had returned the writ served; and now Sergeant moved for a distringas, to compel an appearance on the part of the State.

While, however, the court held the motion under advisement, it was voluntarily withdrawn, and the suit discontinued.
