= West v. Randall =

West v. Randall (29 F. Cas. 718 (R.I. 1820)) is one of the earliest class action lawsuits cases in the early United States under federal case law in which one individual was allowed to sue on behalf of a larger group. The decision was written by Justice Joseph Story, who was serving on the United States Court of Appeals for the First Circuit. The court decided that West's case had no merit and ruled in favor of Randall.

The case involved a dispute over the estate of William West, a Revolutionary War general from Rhode Island and a party in the first US Supreme Court decision, West v. Barnes (1791).

According to West v. Randall, West had died in 1814, and there was a dispute over who must be made a party to the lawsuit regarding his estate. It set an important precedent because the modern class action lawsuit originated from equity actions such as this case: "It is a general rule in equity, that all persons materially interested, either as plaintiffs or defendants in the subject matter of the bill ought to be made parties to the suit, however numerous they may be."
