= Jabez Bowen =

American judge (1739–1815)

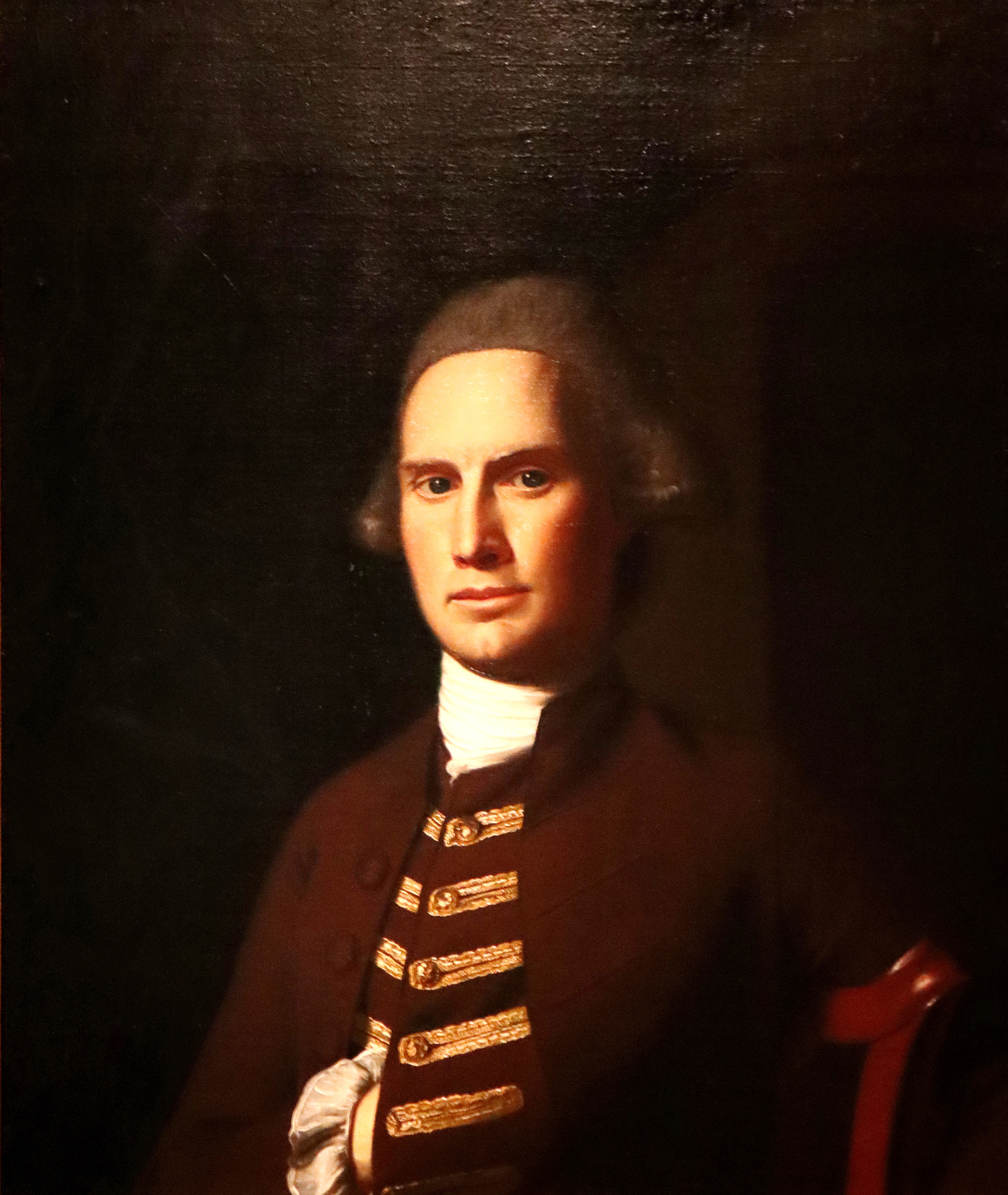
- John Singleton Copley, Portrait of Jabez Bowen, undated. Oil on canvas, 30 x 25 in., Museum of Fine Arts, Houston

Chief Justice of the Rhode Island Supreme Court
- In office 1781–1782

47th Deputy Governor of Rhode Island
- In office 1781–1786
- Preceded by: William West
- Succeeded by: Daniel Owen

45th Deputy Governor of Rhode Island
- In office 1778–1780
- Preceded by: William Bradford
- Succeeded by: William West

Rhode Island Superior Court Judge
- In office 1776–1777

2nd Chancellor of Brown University
- In office 1785–1815
- Preceded by: Stephen Hopkins
- Succeeded by: Alexander Viets Griswold

Personal details
- Born: June 2, 1739 Providence, RI, United States
- Died: May 7, 1815 (aged 75) Providence, Rhode Island, United States
- Resting place: Swan Point Cemetery; Providence, Rhode Island
- Party: Federalist
- Spouse(s): Sarah Brown; Peddy Leonard
- Relations: Moses Brown; John Brown
- Children: Henry Bowen
- Parent(s): Ephraim Bowen; Mary (Fenner) Bowen
- Education: Yale College
- Occupation: Shipper; Politician

Military service
- Branch/service: Continental Army
- Years of service: 1774–1777
- Rank: Colonel
- Unit: Rhode Island Militia

Jabez Bowen Sr. (June 2, 1739 – May 7, 1815) was an American shipper, slave trader and politician. He was a militia colonel during the American Revolutionary War, and served as Deputy Governor of Rhode Island and chief justice of the Rhode Island Supreme Court.

== Early life ==
Bowen was born in Providence, Rhode Island, the son of Ephraim Bowen and Mary (Fenner) Bowen. His father was a prominent doctor in Providence in 1739, and his great-uncle Jabez Bowen was also a prominent Providence physician. In 1757, Bowen graduated from Yale College.

He married Sarah Brown on December 19, 1762, a cousin of Moses Brown and John Brown of the prominent Brown family (see Brown University) of Providence. Bowen was deeply involved with the Browns in the shipping business, involving slaves, molasses, rum, and the China trade.

== Political career ==
He was a member of the Providence town council from 1773 to 1775, and was a representative in the General Assembly in 1777. During the American Revolution, Bowen served in the Rhode Island Militia from 1774 to 1777, serving as the colonel of the First Regiment of Providence County from 1776 to 1777. He served under Brigadier General William West who would later, like Bowen, serve as Deputy Governor of the state.

Bowen was Deputy Governor of Rhode Island for a total of seven years from May 1778 to May 1780, and from May 1781 to May 1786. He was a delegate to the Annapolis Convention in 1786 and the Constitutional Convention in 1790.

He served as a Superior Court judge from August 1776 to May 1778, and became chief justice in February 1781 following the death of Shearjashub Bourn, holding that office until May 1781. Bowen was an ardent federalist (pro-Constitution) supporter, and was on the city committee which negotiated a peaceful end to William West's antifederalist protest on the Fourth of July in 1788. Bowen served as Chancellor of Brown University from 1785 until his death.

He died on May 7, 1815, in Providence, and is interred in Swan Point Cemetery in Providence.

== Personal life ==
Bowen and his first wife, Sarah Brown, married December 19, 1762, had 11 children together. After Sarah's death, he married Peddy Leonard on May 21, 1801; they had no children together. Bowen's son Henry served as Rhode Island Secretary of State from 1819 to 1849.

He was a Freemason in St. Johns Lodge #1 Providence, and served as Master of the lodge from 1779 to 1790, and served as Grand Master in Providence from 1794 to 1798. Bowen was elected a member of the American Antiquarian Society in 1814.

His mahogany tea table is currently at the Winterthur Museum, Garden and Library in Winterthur, Delaware. The tea table was made in 1763 by John Goddard at Goddard and Townsend in Newport, Rhode Island.

Political offices
Preceded by William Bradford	Deputy Governor of Rhode Island; 1778–1779	Succeeded by William West
Preceded by William West	Deputy Governor of Rhode Island; 1781–1786	Succeeded by Daniel Owen
