= Van Staphorst v. Maryland =

- Supreme Court of the United States
- Full case name: Van Staphorst v. Maryland
- Citations: 2 U.S. 401 (more) 2 Dall. 401

Holding
- None settled

Case opinion
- Majority: None

Van Staphorst v. Maryland, 2 U.S. (2 Dall.) 401 (1791), was the first case docketed with the United States Supreme Court. Although the court agreed to hear and decide the case, the suit was settled before oral arguments. Collet v. Collet was the first appellate case docketed with the court, but it was dropped before arguments. West v. Barnes was the first case decided by the court.

In the case, Nicolaas and Jacob van Staphorst lent money to the State of Maryland during the Revolutionary War. Maryland refused to pay back the loan according to the terms the Van Staphorst brothers demanded. After the threat of Supreme Court litigation, the parties finally settled with each other.

== Background ==
In 1781, the State of Maryland appointed Thomas Ridley to act as an agent for the procurement of loans and supplies. The legislature specified specific values that Ridley was to observe as minimum values for flour and tobacco that would be used to repay the loan. Arriving in Europe, Ridley was unsuccessful in France and went to Holland. Thereafter, an initial attempt at a deal was made with Jacob and Nicolaas Van Staphorst for a modest loan. Under the terms of the loan, 300,000 to 600,000 florins of credit were extended on terms similar to those extended to John Adams for the Continental Congress. Instead of receiving money as repayment, the Van Staphorst Brothers would receive tobacco as interest.

The main issue was the portion of the agreements pertaining to the 1000 hogsheads of tobacco to be paid as interest. Under the agreement, Van Staphorst would buy the tobacco at a fixed price and resell it. If a lesser amount satisfied the interest due, then the remainder would still be purchased at the lower price for resale and profit by the Van Staphorsts. When the legislature realized that an agreement had been reached at their minimum price in conjunction with the end of the war, they realized that the tobacco was worth considerably more than what they would be required to sell it for. The legislature still ratified the loan based on the idea that the wording would change, and only the portion to satisfy the interest would be required. However, this was not to be the case. Ridley attempted to change this with the Van Staphorsts, but they refused.

Despite the disagreement over the implementation, Ridley continued to attempt a resolution. By 1784, the Van Staphorst Brothers cut off correspondence. Following this, the State of Maryland refused to comply with the terms, arguing that the prescribed amount was not raised (in this case, a minimum of 300,000 florins) and the contract was unfavorable. However, the state did recognize that nearly 250,000 florins had been raised and that an arrangement was to be made on that amount. Despite this, Maryland refused to deliver the tobacco per the original contract. In 1786, the Maryland House of Delegates proposed paying a three-year fixed interest rate of 7.5% and a 6% rate of interest until the principal of the loan was paid. The Van Staphorsts rejected this proposal. Both sides agreed to arbitration, which was set for 1787.

The arbitration was scheduled but suspended pending a new proposal from the legislature. Under the proposal, the State of Maryland would make specified payments of interest for five to ten years, all of which were contingent upon the repayment of the loan principal to the Van Staphorsts Brothers. Additional payment would be made to the brothers as an indemnity against the losses suffered for not receiving the hogsheads of tobacco. To pay for this, the state levied import duties on various goods then being imported. The commissioners appointed for the resolution were to determine a resolution via negotiation. Despite the attempts to reach a negotiated settlement, no resolution was made. Accordingly, the State of Maryland repealed the statute for compensation and planned use of the import duties to pay interest on the loan as planned.

The State of Maryland then began to make payments on the loan to the agents of the Van Staphorst. The Van Staphorsts were not satisfied with the payments and initiated suit in the United States Supreme Court. The suit was lodged and in November 1790 the State of Maryland was issued a summons to appear in Philadelphia in February 1791.
