= Georgia v. Brailsford (1792) =

- Supreme Court of the United States

Decided August 11, 1792
- Full case name: The State of Georgia v. Brailsford, et al.
- Citations: 2 U.S. 402 (more) 2 Dall. 402; 1 L. Ed. 433

Case history
- Subsequent: Georgia v. Brailsford, 2 U.S. (2 Dall.) 415 (1793); Georgia v. Brailsford, 3 U.S. (3 Dall.) 1 (1794)

Holding
- A state may sue in the Supreme Court.

Court membership
- Chief Justice John Jay Associate Justices James Wilson · William Cushing; John Blair Jr. · James Iredell; Thomas Johnson

Case opinions
- Seriatim: Iredell
- Seriatim: Blair
- Seriatim: Wilson
- Seriatim: Jay
- Dissent: Johnson
- Dissent: Cushing

Georgia v. Brailsford, 2 U.S. (2 Dall.) 402 (1792), was a United States Supreme Court case in which the Court held that "[a] State may sue in the Supreme Court to enjoin payment of a judgment in behalf of a British creditor taken on a debt, which was confiscated by the State, until it can be ascertained to whom the money belongs".

The case was the first United States Supreme Court case where a state appeared as a party. It includes an opinion from Thomas Johnson, who joined the court on November 7, 1791, and resigned after fourteen months.
