= United States Reports, volume 2 =

Supreme Court of the United States
- Interactive map of Supreme Court of the United States
- 38°53′26″N 77°00′16″W
- Established: March 4, 1789; 237 years ago
- Location: Washington, D.C.
- Coordinates: 38°53′26″N 77°00′16″W
- Composition method: Presidential nomination with Senate confirmation
- Authorised by: Constitution of the United States, Art. III, § 1
- Judge term length: life tenure, subject to impeachment and removal
- Number of positions: 9 (by statute)
- Website: supremecourt.gov

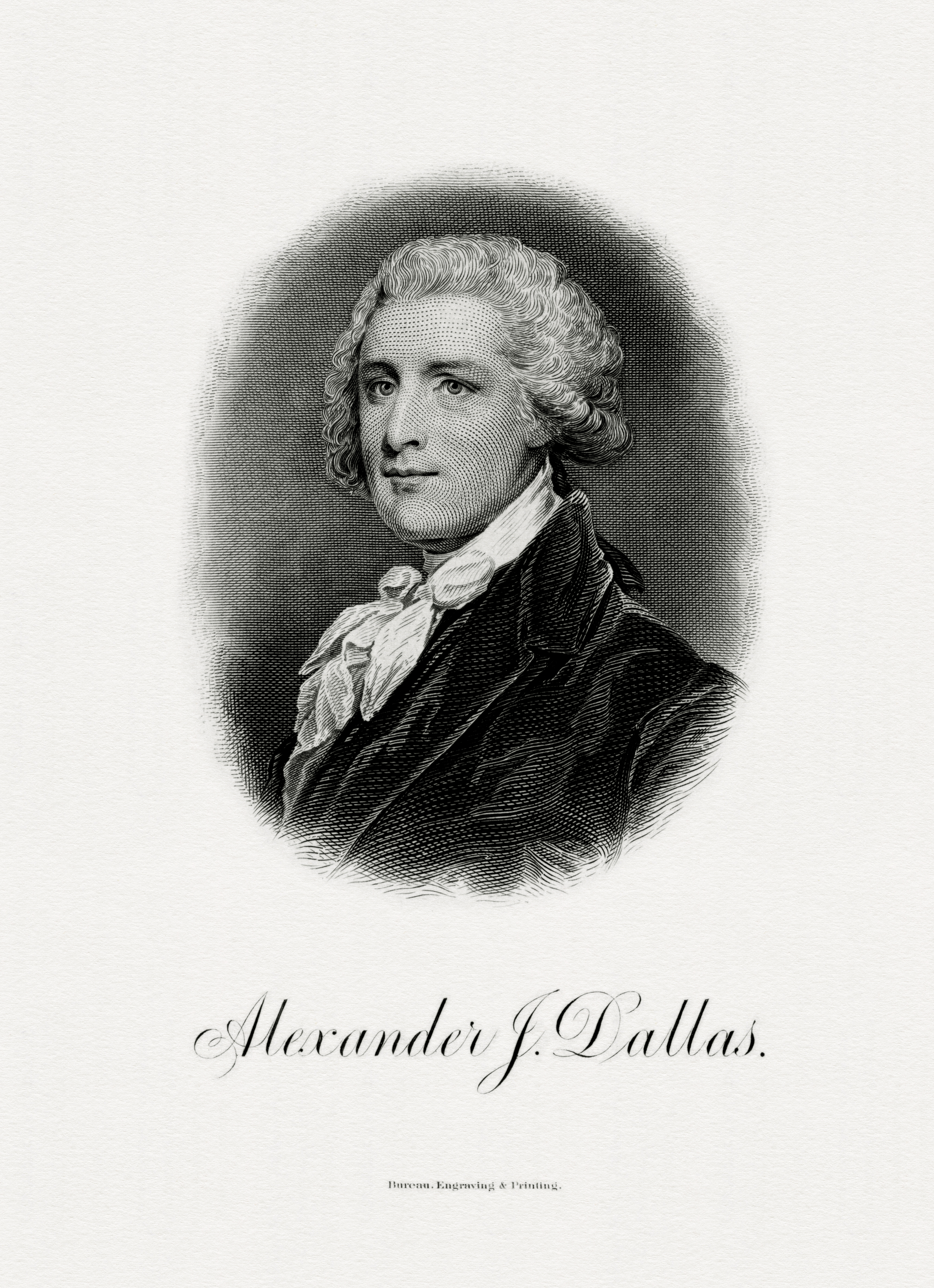
Alexander Dallas as Secretary of the Treasury (1814–1816)

This is a list of all the United States Supreme Court cases from volume 2 of the United States Reports, decided by the Supreme Court of the United States from 1791 to 1793. Case reports from other federal and state tribunals also appear in 2 U.S. (2 Dall.).

== Alexander Dallas and Dallas Reports ==
Not all of the cases reported in 2 U.S. (2 Dall.) are from the United States Supreme Court. The volume includes decisions from various Pennsylvania appellate and trial courts, and from several federal courts. Alexander J. Dallas, a Philadelphia lawyer and later United States Secretary of the Treasury, had been in the business of reporting local law cases for newspapers and periodicals. When the U.S. Supreme Court sat in Philadelphia from 1791 to 1800, he collected their cases as well, and later began compiling his case reports in a bound volume which he called Reports of cases ruled and adjudged in the courts of Pennsylvania, before and since the Revolution.

When the U.S. Supreme Court along with the rest of the new federal government moved in 1791 from the former capital of New York City to the nation's temporary capital in Philadelphia, Dallas was appointed the Supreme Court's first unofficial and unpaid Supreme Court Reporter. (Court reporters in that age received no salary, but were expected to profit from the publication and sale of their compiled decisions.) Dallas continued to collect and publish Pennsylvania and other decisions. When the U.S. Supreme Court began to hear cases and file opinions, he added U.S. Supreme Court cases to the second volume of his reports. As Lawrence M. Friedman has explained: "In this volume, quietly and unobtrusively, began that magnificent series of reports, extending in an unbroken line to the present, that chronicles the work of the world's most powerful court." Dallas published four volumes of decisions during his tenure as Reporter, known as the Dallas Reports.

The Supreme Court moved to the new capital city of Washington, D.C. in 1800. Dallas remained in Philadelphia; William Cranch then replaced him as Reporter of Decisions of the Supreme Court of the United States.

== Nominative Reports ==
In 1874, the U.S. government created the United States Reports, and retroactively numbered older privately published case reports as part of the new series. As a result, cases appearing in volumes 1–90 of U.S. Reports have dual citation forms; one for the volume number of U.S. Reports, and one for the volume number of the reports named for the relevant reporter of decisions (these are called "nominative reports"). As such, volumes 1–4 of United States Reports correspond to volumes 1–4 of Dallas Reports. The dual citation form of, for example, Oswald v. New York is 2 U.S. (2 Dall.) 401 (1791).

== Courts in 2 U.S. (2 Dall.) ==
The cases reported in 2 U.S. (2 Dall.) come from the Pennsylvania High Court of Errors and Appeals (Pa. Ct. Err. & App.) (which from its creation in 1780 to its dissolution in 1808 was the court of last resort in the Pennsylvania judiciary); Supreme Court of Pennsylvania (Pa.); Pennsylvania Court of Common Pleas (Pa. Ct. Com. Pl.); Supreme Court of the United States; United States Court of Appeals in Cases of Capture (Ct. App. in Cases of Capture); United States Circuit Court for the District of Pennsylvania (C.C.D. Pa.). (To avoid confusion, the Court of Errors and Appeals will be cited as "Pa. Ct. Err. & App." rather than as "Pa.", although the latter abbreviation should be used, according to Bluebook rules, for the highest court in Pennsylvania at a particular time. Rather, "Pa." will consistently be used to indicate the Supreme Court of Pennsylvania.)

== Justices of the Supreme Court at the time of 2 U.S. (2 Dall.) ==
The Supreme Court is established by Article III, Section 1 of the Constitution of the United States, which says: "The judicial Power of the United States, shall be vested in one supreme Court . . .". The size of the Court is not specified; the Constitution leaves it to Congress to set the number of justices. Under the Judiciary Act of 1789 Congress originally fixed the number of justices at six (one chief justice and five associate justices). Since 1789 Congress has varied the size of the Court from six to seven, nine, ten, and back to nine justices (always including one chief justice).

When the cases in 2 U.S. (2 Dall.) were decided, the Court comprised these six justices:

Portrait	Justice	Office	Home State	Succeeded	Date confirmed by the Senate (Vote)	Tenure on Supreme Court
	John Jay	Chief Justice	New York	original seat when the Court was established	September 26, 1789 (Acclamation)	October 19, 1789 – June 29, 1795 (Resigned)
	William Cushing	Associate Justice	Massachusetts	original seat when the Court was established	September 26, 1789 (Acclamation)	February 2, 1790 – September 13, 1810 (Died)
	James Wilson	Associate Justice	Pennsylvania	original seat when the Court was established	September 26, 1789 (Acclamation)	October 5, 1789 – August 21, 1798 (Died)
	John Blair	Associate Justice	Virginia	original seat when the Court was established	September 26, 1789 (Acclamation)	February 2, 1790 – October 25, 1795 (Resigned)
	James Iredell	Associate Justice	North Carolina	original seat when the Court was established	February 10, 1790 (Acclamation)	May 12, 1790 – October 20, 1799 (Died)
	Thomas Johnson	Associate Justice	Maryland	John Rutledge	November 7, 1791 (Acclamation)	August 6, 1792 – January 16, 1793 (Resigned)

== Notable Case in 2 U.S. (2 Dall.) ==
=== West v. Barnes ===
West v. Barnes, 2 U.S. (2 Dall.) 401 (1791), is the first United States Supreme Court decision and the earliest case calling for oral argument. Van Staphorst v. Maryland (1791) was docketed prior to West v. Barnes but settled before the Court heard the case: West was argued on August 2, 1791, and decided on August 3, 1791. Collet v. Collet (1792) was the first appellate case docketed with the Court but was dropped before it could be heard. Supreme Court Reporter Alexander Dallas did not publish the justices' full opinions in West v. Barnes, which were published in various newspapers around the country at the time, but he published an abbreviated summary of the decisions.

The Court ultimately decided West on procedural grounds, holding that a writ of error (a kind of appeal) must be issued within ten days by the Clerk of the Supreme Court of the United States as required by federal statute, and not by a lower court located closer to the plaintiff in Rhode Island. As a result of this case, Congress ultimately changed this procedure with the ninth section of the Process and Compensation Act of 1792, allowing circuit courts to issue these writs, thereby assisting citizens living far away from the capital.

=== Chisholm v. Georgia ===
Chisholm v. Georgia, 2 U.S. (2 Dall.) 419 (1793), is considered the first United States Supreme Court case of significance and impact. Given its early date, there was little available legal precedent (particularly in U.S. law). The Court's holding in the case was superseded in 1795 by the 11th Amendment. Under the 11th Amendment, citizens of one state or of foreign countries can only sue a state with the state's consent or if Congress, pursuant to a valid exercise of 14th Amendment remedial powers, abrogates the states' immunity from suit.

== Citation style ==
Under the Judiciary Act of 1789 the federal court structure at the time comprised District Courts, which had general trial jurisdiction; Circuit Courts, which had mixed trial and appellate (from the US District Courts) jurisdiction; and the United States Supreme Court, which had appellate jurisdiction over the federal District and Circuit courts—and for certain issues over state courts. The Supreme Court also had limited original jurisdiction (i.e., in which cases could be filed directly with the Supreme Court without first having been heard by a lower federal or state court). There were one or more federal District Courts and/or Circuit Courts in each state, territory, or other geographical region.

Bluebook citation style is used for case names, citations, and jurisdictions.

- "C.C.D." = United States Circuit Court for the District of . . .
  - e.g.,"C.C.D.N.J." = United States Circuit Court for the District of New Jersey
- "D." = United States District Court for the District of . . .
  - e.g.,"D. Mass." = United States District Court for the District of Massachusetts
- "E." = Eastern; "M." = Middle; "N." = Northern; "S." = Southern; "W." = Western
  - e.g.,"C.C.S.D.N.Y." = United States Circuit Court for the Southern District of New York
  - e.g.,"M.D. Ala." = United States District Court for the Middle District of Alabama
- "Ct. Cl." = United States Court of Claims
- "Ct. Com. Pl." = Court of Common Pleas (a state court)
- The abbreviation of a state's name alone indicates the highest appellate court in that state's judiciary at the time.
  - e.g.,"Pa." = Supreme Court of Pennsylvania
  - e.g.,"Me." = Supreme Judicial Court of Maine

== List of cases in 2 U.S. (2 Dall.) ==
=== Cases of the Supreme Court of the United States ===
Case Name	Page & year	Opinion of the Court	Concurring opinion(s)	Dissenting opinion(s)	Lower court	Disposition
West v. Barnes	401 (1791)	per curiam in Dallas (but seriatim opinions by Iredell, Blair, Wilson, Cushing, Jay opinions were widely reported in period newspapers)	none	none	C.C.D.R.I.	removal denied
Writs of error to remove causes to this court from inferior courts, can regularly issue only from the clerk's office of the court.
Van Staphorst v. Maryland	401 (1791)	per curiam	none	none	original	motion granted
None; suit was settled before oral arguments. The first Supreme Court case set for argument.
Oswald v. New York I	401 (1792)	per curiam	none	none	not indicated	motion for distraint withdrawn
Oswald v. New York II	402 (1792)	per curiam	none	none	original	rule granted
Georgia v. Brailsford I	402 (1792)	seriatim: Johnson, Iredell, Blair, Wilson, Cushing, Jay	none	none	C.C.D. Ga.	injunction granted
Hayburn's Case	409 (1792)	per curiam	none	none	C.C.D. Pa.	mandamus denied
Non-judicial duties cannot be assigned to federal courts in their official capacity.
Oswald v. New York III	415 (1792)	per curiam	none	none	original	New York ordered to appear
Georgia v. Brailsford II	415 (1793)	seriatim: Iredell, Blair, Jay	none	none	original	continued
Chisholm v. Georgia	419 (1793)	seriatim: Iredell, Blair, Wilson, Cushing, Jay	none	none	original	Georgia ordered to appear
Article III, Section 2 grants federal courts jurisdiction in cases between a state and a citizen of another state wherein the state is the defendant.

=== Cases of other tribunals ===
Note on Respublica: A number of cases listed below include the title Respublica. Res publica is a Latin form of the term "Commonwealth," meaning in this context the "Commonwealth of Pennsylvania." Pennsylvania is one of four states (along with Massachusetts, Virginia, and Kentucky) to refer to itself as a "Commonwealth." It is interchangeable with "State." In the early 19th Century the English term Commonwealth replaced Respublica in new Pennsylvania case names.

Case	Page and year	Court
The Ship Resolution I	1 (Ct. App. in Cases of Capture 1781)	United States Court of Appeals in Cases of Capture
The Ship Resolution II	19 (Ct. App. in Cases of Capture 1781)	United States Court of Appeals in Cases of Capture
The Brig Erstern	34 (Ct. App. in Cases of Capture 1782)	United States Court of Appeals in Cases of Capture
The Brig Gloucester	36 (Ct. App. in Cases of Capture 1782)	United States Court of Appeals in Cases of Capture
Stoddard v. Read	40 (Ct. App. in Cases of Capture 1783)	United States Court of Appeals in Cases of Capture
Bain v. Speedwell	40 (Ct. App. in Cases of Capture 1784)	United States Court of Appeals in Cases of Capture
The Sloop Chester v. The Brig Experiment	41 (Ct. App. in Cases of Capture 1787)	United States Court of Appeals in Cases of Capture
Lake v. Hulbert	41 (Ct. App. in Cases of Capture 1787)	United States Court of Appeals in Cases of Capture
Boinod v. Pelosi	43 (Pa. Ct. Com. Pl. 1788)	Pennsylvania Court of Common Pleas
Bowen v. Douglass	44 (Pa. Ct. Com. Pl. 1790)	Pennsylvania Court of Common Pleas
Inglis ex rel. Reede v. Inglis's Executors	45 (Pa. Ct. Com. Pl. 1790)	Pennsylvania Court of Common Pleas
Innis v. Miller	50 (Pa. Ct. Com. Pl. 1790)	Pennsylvania Court of Common Pleas
Rapalje v. Emory	51 (Pa. Ct. Com. Pl. 1790)	Pennsylvania Court of Common Pleas
M'Clenachan v. M'Carty	51 (Pa. Ct. Com. Pl. 1790)	Pennsylvania Court of Common Pleas
Cowperthwaite v. Jones	55 (Pa. Ct. Com. Pl. 1790)	Pennsylvania Court of Common Pleas
Rue v. Mitchell	58 (Pa. Ct. Com. Pl. 1790)	Pennsylvania Court of Common Pleas
Price v. Ralston	60 (Pa. Ct. Com. Pl. 1790)	Pennsylvania Court of Common Pleas
Woglam v. Cowperthwaite	68 (Pa. Ct. Com. Pl. 1790)	Pennsylvania Court of Common Pleas
Powell v. Biddle	70 (Pa. Ct. Com. Pl. 1790)	Pennsylvania Court of Common Pleas
Lawrence v. Doublebower	73 (Pa. Ct. Com. Pl. 1790)	Pennsylvania Court of Common Pleas
M'Coombe v. Dunch	73 (Pa. Ct. Com. Pl. 1790)	Pennsylvania Court of Common Pleas
Brailey v. Miller	74 (Pa. Ct. Com. Pl. 1790)	Pennsylvania Court of Common Pleas
Howell v. Woolfort	75 (Pa. Ct. Com. Pl. 1790)	Pennsylvania Court of Common Pleas
Sharpe v. Thatcher	77 (Pa. Ct. Com. Pl. 1790)	Pennsylvania Court of Common Pleas
Bank of North America v. Vardon	78 (Pa. Ct. Com. Pl. 1790)	Pennsylvania Court of Common Pleas
In re Galberaith	78 (Pa. Ct. Com. Pl. 1790)	Pennsylvania Court of Common Pleas
Myers v. Young	79 (Pa. Ct. Com. Pl. 1790)	Pennsylvania Court of Common Pleas
Miltenberger v. Lloyd	79 (Pa. Ct. Com. Pl. 1790)	Pennsylvania Court of Common Pleas
Stackhouse's Lessee v. Stackhouse	80 (Pa. 1766)	Supreme Court of Pennsylvania
Master's Lessee v. Shute	81 (Pa. 1766)	Supreme Court of Pennsylvania
Taxier v. Sweet	81 (Pa. 1766)	Supreme Court of Pennsylvania
Respublica v. M'Carty	86 (Pa. 1781)	Supreme Court of Pennsylvania
Respublica v. Weidle	88 (Pa. 1781)	Supreme Court of Pennsylvania
Boyd v. Bopst	91 (Pa. 1785)	Supreme Court of Pennsylvania
Wycoff v. Longhead	92 (Pa. 1785)	Supreme Court of Pennsylvania
Respublica v. Steele	92 (Pa. 1785)	Supreme Court of Pennsylvania
Andrew's Lessee v. Fleming	93 (Pa. 1786)	Supreme Court of Pennsylvania
Pennington v. Scott	94 (Pa. 1786)	Supreme Court of Pennsylvania
Galbraith's Lessee v. Scott	95 (Pa. 1786)	Supreme Court of Pennsylvania
Cecil's Lessee v. Lebenstone	95 (Pa. 1786)	Supreme Court of Pennsylvania
Lesher's Lessee v. Levan	96 (Pa. 1786)	Supreme Court of Pennsylvania
Cockshot's Lessee v. Hopkins	97 (Pa. 1787)	Supreme Court of Pennsylvania
Pringle v. Black's Executors	97 (Pa. 1787)	Supreme Court of Pennsylvania
McCurdy v. Potts	98 (Pa. 1788)	Supreme Court of Pennsylvania
Watts v. Willing	100 (Pa. 1788)	Supreme Court of Pennsylvania
M'Kimm v. Riddle	100 (Pa. 1789)	Supreme Court of Pennsylvania
Donaldson v. Chambers	100 (Pa. 1789)	Supreme Court of Pennsylvania
Respublica v. Mitchell	101 (Pa. 1789)	Supreme Court of Pennsylvania
Respublica v. St. Clair	101 (Pa. 1789)	Supreme Court of Pennsylvania
Hoare v. Allen	102 (Pa. 1789)	Supreme Court of Pennsylvania
Todd v. Thompson	105 (Pa. 1790)	Supreme Court of Pennsylvania
Respublica v. Matlack	108 (Pa. 1790)	Supreme Court of Pennsylvania
Respublica v. Coates	109 (Pa. 1790)	Supreme Court of Pennsylvania
Borger v. Searle	110 (Pa. 1790)	Supreme Court of Pennsylvania
Vasse v. Spicer	111 (Pa. 1790)	Supreme Court of Pennsylvania
Ex parte Holker	111 (Pa. 1790)	Supreme Court of Pennsylvania
Respublica v. Griffiths	112 (Pa. 1790)	Supreme Court of Pennsylvania
Walker v. Wallace	113 (Pa. 1790)	Supreme Court of Pennsylvania
Ferguson v. Baron	113 (Pa. 1790)	Supreme Court of Pennsylvania
Vansciver v. Bolton	114 (Pa. 1790)	Supreme Court of Pennsylvania
Coventry Township v. Cummings	114 (Pa. 1790)	Supreme Court of Pennsylvania
Tarin v. Morris	115 (Pa. 1790)	Supreme Court of Pennsylvania
Douglass's Lessee v. Sanderson	116 (Pa. 1791)	Supreme Court of Pennsylvania
Respublica v. Lacaze	118 (Pa. 1791)	Supreme Court of Pennsylvania
Respublica v. Roberts	124 (Pa. 1791)	Supreme Court of Pennsylvania
Leech v. Armitage	125 (Pa. 1791)	Supreme Court of Pennsylvania
Joy's Lessee v. Cossart	126 (Pa. 1791)	Supreme Court of Pennsylvania
Scott v. Crosdale	127 (Pa. 1791)	Supreme Court of Pennsylvania
Thompson v. Thompson	128 (Pa. 1791)	Supreme Court of Pennsylvania
Sweeny's Lessee v. Toner	129 (Pa. 1791)	Supreme Court of Pennsylvania
Nichols v. Postlethwaite	131 (Pa. 1791)	Supreme Court of Pennsylvania
Frey v. Leeper	131 (Pa. 1791)	Supreme Court of Pennsylvania
Ricup v. Bixter	132 (Pa. 1791)	Supreme Court of Pennsylvania
Foxcrait v. Nagle	132 (Pa. 1791)	Supreme Court of Pennsylvania
Bond v. Haas's Executors	133 (Pa. 1791)	Supreme Court of Pennsylvania
Ingraham v. Gibbs	134 (Pa. 1791)	Supreme Court of Pennsylvania
Hood's Executors v. Nesbit	137 (Pa. 1792)	Supreme Court of Pennsylvania
Caton v. M'Carty	141 (Pa. 1792)	Supreme Court of Pennsylvania
Mercier v. Mercier	142 (Pa. 1792)	Supreme Court of Pennsylvania
Jackson v. Vanderspreigle's Executor	142 (Pa. 1792)	Supreme Court of Pennsylvania
Same Cause	143 (Pa. 1792)	Supreme Court of Pennsylvania
Jones v. Ross	143 (Pa. 1792)	Supreme Court of Pennsylvania
Nesbit v. Pope	143 (Pa. 1792)	Supreme Court of Pennsylvania
Gorgerat v. M'Carty	144 (Pa. 1792)	Supreme Court of Pennsylvania
Clayton's Lessee v. Alshouse	150 (Pa. 1792)	Supreme Court of Pennsylvania
Foxcraft v. Nagle	150 (Pa. 1792)	Supreme Court of Pennsylvania
Barr v. Craig	151 (Pa. 1792)	Supreme Court of Pennsylvania
Wenn v. Adams	156 (Pa. 1792)	Supreme Court of Pennsylvania
Duffield v. Stille	156 (Pa. 1792)	Supreme Court of Pennsylvania
Austin v. Snow's Lessee	157 (Pa. 1792)	Supreme Court of Pennsylvania
Stewart v. Ross	157 (Pa. 1792)	Supreme Court of Pennsylvania
Stewart v. Biddack	158 (Pa. 1792)	Supreme Court of Pennsylvania
Bank of North America v. M'Knight	158 (Pa. 1792)	Supreme Court of Pennsylvania
Ralston v. Bell	158 (Pa. 1792)	Supreme Court of Pennsylvania
Ross v. Rittenhouse	160 (Pa. 1792)	Supreme Court of Pennsylvania
Marshall v. Montgomery	170 (Pa. 1792)	Supreme Court of Pennsylvania
Field ex rel. Oxley v. Biddle	171 (Pa. 1792)	Supreme Court of Pennsylvania
M'Minn v. Owen	173 (Pa. 1792)	Supreme Court of Pennsylvania
Henderson v. Clarkson	174 (Pa. 1792)	Supreme Court of Pennsylvania
Haldane v. Duche's Executor	176 (Pa. 1792)	Supreme Court of Pennsylvania
Shaw v. Wallace	179 (Pa. 1792)	Supreme Court of Pennsylvania
Lynn v. Risberg	180 (Pa. 1792)	Supreme Court of Pennsylvania
Wood v. Roach	180 (Pa. 1792)	Supreme Court of Pennsylvania
Knight v. Reese	182 (Pa. 1792)	Supreme Court of Pennsylvania
Jones v. Little	182 (Pa. 1792)	Supreme Court of Pennsylvania
Bloomfield v. Budden	183 (Pa. 1792)	Supreme Court of Pennsylvania
White v. Lynch	183 (Pa. 1792)	Supreme Court of Pennsylvania
Scott v. M'Kisson	183 (Pa. 1792)	Supreme Court of Pennsylvania
Fury v. Stone	184 (Pa. 1792)	Supreme Court of Pennsylvania
Johns v. Nichols	184 (Pa. 1792)	Supreme Court of Pennsylvania
Rapp v. Elliot	184 (Pa. 1792)	Supreme Court of Pennsylvania
Morris's Executors v. M'Connaughy	189 (Pa. 1792)	Supreme Court of Pennsylvania
Respublica v. Askew	189 (Pa. 1792)	Supreme Court of Pennsylvania
Walker's Appeal	190 (Pa. 1792)	Supreme Court of Pennsylvania
Sheredine v. Gaul	190 (Pa. 1792)	Supreme Court of Pennsylvania
Grubb's Executors v. Grubb's Executors	191 (Pa. 1792)	Supreme Court of Pennsylvania
Vaughan v. Blanchard	192 (Pa. 1792)	Supreme Court of Pennsylvania
Mallory v. Kirwan	192 (Pa. 1792)	Supreme Court of Pennsylvania
Knox v. Jones	193 (Pa. 1792)	Supreme Court of Pennsylvania
Stille v. Lynch	194 (Pa. 1792)	Supreme Court of Pennsylvania
Cupisino v. Perez	194 (Pa. 1792)	Supreme Court of Pennsylvania
Pleasants v. Pemberton	196 (Pa. 1793)	Supreme Court of Pennsylvania
Boyce v. Moore	196 (Pa. 1793)	Supreme Court of Pennsylvania
Respublica v. Keppele	197 (Pa. 1793)	Supreme Court of Pennsylvania
Barnes's Lessee v. Irwin	199 (Pa. 1793)	Supreme Court of Pennsylvania
Fitzalden v. Lee	205 (Pa. 1793)	Supreme Court of Pennsylvania
Duncan v. Walker	205 (Pa. 1793)	Supreme Court of Pennsylvania
Roach v. Pennsylvania	206 (Pa. 1793)	Supreme Court of Pennsylvania
Walker v. Gibbs	211 (Pa. 1793)	Supreme Court of Pennsylvania
Shoemaker v. Keely	213 (Pa. 1793)	Supreme Court of Pennsylvania
Upper Dublin Township v. Borough of Germantown	213 (Pa. 1793)	Supreme Court of Pennsylvania
Stansbury v. Marks	213 (Pa. 1793)	Supreme Court of Pennsylvania
Fox's Lessee v. Palmer	214 (Pa. 1793)	Supreme Court of Pennsylvania
Fitzgerald v. Caldwell	215 (Pa. 1793)	Supreme Court of Pennsylvania
Ward v. Hallam	217 (Pa. 1794)	Supreme Court of Pennsylvania
Vance v. Fairis	217 (Pa. 1794)	Supreme Court of Pennsylvania
Fuller v. M'Call	219 (Pa. 1794)	Supreme Court of Pennsylvania
Ingraham v. Gibbs	219 (Pa. 1795)	Supreme Court of Pennsylvania
Lloyd's Lessee v. Taylor	223 (Pa. 1795)	Supreme Court of Pennsylvania
Humphrey's Lessee v. Humphries	223 (Pa. 1795)	Supreme Court of Pennsylvania
Joyce v. Sims	223 (Pa. 1795)	Supreme Court of Pennsylvania
Respublica v. Richards	224 (Pa. 1795)	Supreme Court of Pennsylvania
Respublica v. Guardians	224 (Pa. 1795)	Supreme Court of Pennsylvania
Respublica v. Honeyman	228 (Pa. 1795)	Supreme Court of Pennsylvania
Burrall v. Du Blois	229 (Pa. 1795)	Supreme Court of Pennsylvania
Penn's Lessee v. Hartman	230 (Pa. 1795)	Supreme Court of Pennsylvania
Rapelje v. Emery	231 (Pa. 1795)	Supreme Court of Pennsylvania
Warder v. Carson's Executors	233 (Pa. 1795)	Supreme Court of Pennsylvania
Caignet v. Pettit	234 (Pa. 1795)	Supreme Court of Pennsylvania
Villeneuve v. Barrion	235 (Pa. 1795)	Supreme Court of Pennsylvania
Haddens v. Chambers	236 (Pa. 1795)	Supreme Court of Pennsylvania
De Willer v. Smith	236 (Pa. 1795)	Supreme Court of Pennsylvania
Kachlin v. Mulhallon	237 (Pa. 1795)	Supreme Court of Pennsylvania
Miller v. Leonard	237 (Pa. 1795)	Supreme Court of Pennsylvania
Respublica v. Ross	239 (Pa. 1795)	Supreme Court of Pennsylvania
Ralston v. Bell	242 (Pa. 1796)	Supreme Court of Pennsylvania
Ruston's Executors v. Ruston	243 (Pa. 1796)	Supreme Court of Pennsylvania
Nicholson's Lessee v. Mifflin	246 (Pa. 1796)	Supreme Court of Pennsylvania
Waters v. Collot	247 (Pa. 1796)	Supreme Court of Pennsylvania
Barriere v. Nairac	249 (Pa. 1796)	Supreme Court of Pennsylvania
Perit v. Wallis	252 (Pa. 1796)	Supreme Court of Pennsylvania
Hartshorne's Lessee v. Patton	252 (Pa. 1796)	Supreme Court of Pennsylvania
Respublica v. Nicholson	256 (Pa. 1796)	Supreme Court of Pennsylvania
Coates's Lessee v. Hamilton	256 (Pa. 1796)	Supreme Court of Pennsylvania
Harris v. Mandeville	256 (Pa. 1796)	Supreme Court of Pennsylvania
Beach v. Lee	257 (Pa. 1796)	Supreme Court of Pennsylvania
Walker v. Dilworth	257 (Pa. 1796)	Supreme Court of Pennsylvania
Roberts v. Cay's Executors	260 (Pa. 1796)	Supreme Court of Pennsylvania
Stiles v. Donaldson	264 (Pa. 1796)	Supreme Court of Pennsylvania
Zantzinger v. Old	265 (Pa. 1796)	Supreme Court of Pennsylvania
Boudinot v. Bradford	266 (Pa. 1796)	Supreme Court of Pennsylvania
German v. Wainwright	266 (Pa. 1796)	Supreme Court of Pennsylvania
Greene's Case	268 (Pa. 1796)	Supreme Court of Pennsylvania
Ewing v. M'Nair	269 (Pa. 1796)	Supreme Court of Pennsylvania
Vasse v. Ball	270 (Pa. 1797)	Supreme Court of Pennsylvania
Young v. Willing	276 (Pa. 1797)	Supreme Court of Pennsylvania
M'Carty v. Emlen	277 (Pa. 1797)	Supreme Court of Pennsylvania
Camberling v. M'Call	280 (Pa. 1797)	Supreme Court of Pennsylvania
Lawson v. Morrison	286 (Pa. Ct. Err. and App. 1792)	Pennsylvania High Court of Errors and Appeals
Hannum v. Spear	291 (Pa. Ct. Err. and App. 1795)	Pennsylvania High Court of Errors and Appeals
Collet v. Collet	294 (C.C.D. Pa. 1792)	United States Circuit Court for the District of Pennsylvania
United States v. Ravara	297 (C.C.D. Pa. 1793)	United States Circuit Court for the District of Pennsylvania
Livingston v. Swanwick	300 (C.C.D. Pa. 1793)	United States Circuit Court for the District of Pennsylvania
Armstrong v. Carson's Executors	302 (C.C.D. Pa. 1794)	United States Circuit Court for the District of Pennsylvania
Brudenell v. Vaux	302 (C.C.D. Pa. 1794)	United States Circuit Court for the District of Pennsylvania
Vanhorne's Lessee v. Dorrance	304 (C.C.D. Pa. 1795)	United States Circuit Court for the District of Pennsylvania
United States v. Guinet	321 (C.C.D. Pa. 1795)	United States Circuit Court for the District of Pennsylvania
Parasset v. Gautier	330 (C.C.D. Pa. 1795)	United States Circuit Court for the District of Pennsylvania
Geyger's Lessee v. Geyger	332 (C.C.D. Pa. 1795)	United States Circuit Court for the District of Pennsylvania
United States v. Caldwell	333 (C.C.D. Pa. 1795)	United States Circuit Court for the District of Pennsylvania
United States v. Insurgents of Pennsylvania	335 (C.C.D. Pa. 1795)	United States Circuit Court for the District of Pennsylvania
United States v. Montgomery	335 (C.C.D. Pa. 1795)	United States Circuit Court for the District of Pennsylvania
United States v. Stewart	343 (C.C.D. Pa. 1795)	United States Circuit Court for the District of Pennsylvania
United States v. Porter	345 (C.C.D. Pa. 1795)	United States Circuit Court for the District of Pennsylvania
United States v. Vigol	346 (C.C.D. Pa. 1795)	United States Circuit Court for the District of Pennsylvania
United States v. Mitchell I	348 (C.C.D. Pa. 1795)	United States Circuit Court for the District of Pennsylvania
United States v. Mitchell II	357 (C.C.D. Pa. 1795)	United States Circuit Court for the District of Pennsylvania
Hulsecamp v. Teel	358 (C.C.D. Pa. 1796)	United States Circuit Court for the District of Pennsylvania
Schermehorn v. l'Espenasse	360 (C.C.D. Pa. 1796)	United States Circuit Court for the District of Pennsylvania
Wharton's Executors v. Lowrey	364 (C.C.D. Pa. 1796)	United States Circuit Court for the District of Pennsylvania
The Cassius	365 (C.C.D. Pa. 1796)	United States Circuit Court for the District of Pennsylvania
United States v. Villato	370 (C.C.D. Pa. 1797)	United States Circuit Court for the District of Pennsylvania
United States v. Parker	373 (C.C.D. Pa. 1797)	United States Circuit Court for the District of Pennsylvania
Hancock v. Hillegas	380 (C.C.D. Pa. 1797)	United States Circuit Court for the District of Pennsylvania
Maxwell's Lessee v. Levy	381 (C.C.D. Pa. 1797)	United States Circuit Court for the District of Pennsylvania
Anonymous	382 (C.C.D. Pa. 1797)	United States Circuit Court for the District of Pennsylvania
Symes's Lessee v. Irvine	383 (C.C.D. Pa. 1797)	United States Circuit Court for the District of Pennsylvania
United States v. Worrall	384 (C.C.D. Pa. 1798)	United States Circuit Court for the District of Pennsylvania
Wilkinson v. Nicklin	396 (C.C.D. Pa. 1798)	United States Circuit Court for the District of Pennsylvania
Hollingsworth v. Adams	396 (C.C.D. Pa. 1798)	United States Circuit Court for the District of Pennsylvania

== See also ==
- Certificate of division
