= West v. Barnes =

- Supreme Court of the United States

Argued August 2, 1791 Decided August 3, 1791
- Full case name: West v. Barnes
- Citations: 2 U.S. 401 (more) 2 Dall. 401

Holding
- Writs of error to remove causes to this court from inferior courts can regularly issue only from the clerk's office of the court.

Court membership
- Chief Justice John Jay Associate Justices James Wilson · William Cushing; John Blair Jr. · James Iredell

Case opinion
- Majority: Unanimous
- Superseded by
- Process Act of 1792

West v. Barnes, 2 U.S. (2 Dall.) 401 (1791), was the first United States Supreme Court decision and the earliest case calling for oral argument. Van Staphorst v. Maryland (1791) was docketed prior to West v. Barnes but settled before the Court heard the case: West was argued on August 2 and decided on August 3, 1791. Collet v. Collet (1792) was the first appellate case docketed with the Court but was dropped before it could be heard. Supreme Court Reporter Alexander Dallas did not publish the justices' full opinions in West v. Barnes, which were published in various newspapers around the country at the time, but he published an abbreviated summary of the decision.

The Court ultimately decided the case on procedural grounds, holding that a writ of error (an appeal) must be issued within ten days by the clerk of the Supreme Court of the United States as required by federal statute, and not by a lower court located closer to the plaintiff in Rhode Island. As a result of this case, Congress ultimately changed this procedure with the ninth section of the Process and Compensation Act of 1792, allowing circuit courts to issue these writs, thereby assisting citizens living far away from the capital.

== Background ==
This was the first case of judicial review in the United States where the Court had the opportunity to overturn a Rhode Island state statute regarding lodging payment of a debt in paper currency in fulfillment of a contract. The court did not exercise judicial review in deference to the legislature. The court ultimately decided against William West, the petitioner, on procedural grounds.

William West was a farmer, Anti-Federalist leader, revolutionary war general, and judge from Scituate, Rhode Island. He owed a mortgage on his farm from a failed molasses deal in 1763 to the Jenckes family from Providence. He made payments on the mortgage for twenty years, and in 1785 asked the state for permission to conduct a lottery to help pay off the remainder. Due to his service during the Revolution, the state granted him permission. Much of the proceeds were paid in paper currency instead of gold or silver. West tendered payment in the paper currency as allowed by state statute, "lodging" the funds with a state judge to be collected within ten days.

David L. Barnes, a Jenckes heir and well-known attorney and later federal judge, brought suit in federal court based on diversity jurisdiction, asserting that gold or silver payment was required, and refusing the paper currency. Despite a lack of formal training, West represented himself pro se in the circuit court in June 1791 before Chief Justice John Jay, Associate Justice William Cushing, and Henry Marchant. They rejected his arguments. West then pursued an appeal to the Supreme Court on a writ of error, attempting to comply with all statutory directions. West was unable to make the journey to Philadelphia to represent himself, so he engaged William Bradford, Jr., Pennsylvania's attorney general, to represent him. On appeal, Barnes focused on the procedural irregularities. Barnes asserted that the writ had been signed and sealed only by the clerk of the circuit court in Rhode Island instead of by the Supreme Court clerk, which he claimed as necessary. This was asserted despite the fact that West would have had to make an arduous journey in 1791 to Philadelphia within ten days to do so. West lost on this procedural issue and was eventually forced to relinquish his farm.

== Opinions ==
The court's full opinion was extensively covered by period newspapers as no official court reporter had yet been published in 1791, and the seriatim opinions were republished in the newspapers and are currently accessible in James R. Perry's The Documentary History of the Supreme Court of the United States, 1789-1800, Volume 6, "West v. Barnes," pp. 3–27. The Documentary History of the Supreme Court of the United States, 1789-1800. Each of the five justices issued a seriatim opinion regarding the writ of error, and the justices unsuccessfully looked to common law precedent from state courts and pre-Revolution English case law, including Coke and Blackstone's treatises. Several of the justices expressed their reservations about the federal statute and suggested alternatives for filing within the ten-day statutory period, but nevertheless, each justice refused to expand the meaning of the statute, believing that only Congress had the power to do so. In summation the Dallas reporter quoted John Jay and summed up the case holding as follows:

West, Plaintiff in error, v. Barnes et al.

On the first day of the term, Bradford presented to the court, a writ, purporting to be a writ of error, issued out of the office of the clerk of the circuit court for Rhode Island district, directed to that court, and commanding a return of the judgment and proceedings rendered by them in this cause: And thereupon he moved for a rule, that the defendant rejoin to the errors assigned in this cause.

Barnes, one of the defendants, (a counsellor of the court) objected to the validity of the writ, that it had issued out of the wrong office: and, after argument,

THE COURT were unanimously of opinion, That writs of error to remove causes to this court from inferior courts, can regularly issue only from the clerk's office of the court.

Motion refused.

== Aftermath ==
Justice James Iredell was upset by the governing statute and wrote to President Washington to change the law, which allowed only the clerk of the Supreme Court to issue writs of error. The ninth section of the Process and Compensation Act of 1792 altered the law to prevent such hardships for future litigants.

Several months after the decision, on November 9, 1791, Barnes brought another suit to eject West from the mortgaged farm. He filed suit in the Circuit Court for the District of Rhode Island. Justice Jay, Justice Cushing and Judge Henry Marchant held the plea bad for a second time. They decided that William West had lodged payment of his debt with a Rhode Island judge on September 16, and so Barnes had had ten days to collect it according to the state statute. The Rhode Island lodging act was, however, suspended on September 19, and so the ten-day period could not fully occur since only three days had passed and was thus not conformable to the statute. Barnes did eventually win the ejectment case, but he had difficulty ejecting West's family from the farm because West had sold the farm to a son-in-law. West's estate continued to be disputed after his death, resulting in the First Circuit decision West v. Randall in 1820.
