= William West (Rhode Island politician) =

American judge (c.1733–1816)

46th Deputy Governor of Rhode Island
- In office May 1780 – May 1781
- Preceded by: Jabez Bowen
- Succeeded by: Jabez Bowen

Personal details
- Born: 1733 North Kingstown, Rhode Island, British America
- Died: 1816 (aged 82–83) Scituate, Rhode Island, U.S.

Military service
- Allegiance: United States
- Branch/service: Continental Army
- Rank: Brigadier General
- Commands: Rhode Island Militia
- Battles/wars: American Revolutionary War; Battle of Rhode Island

William West (c. 1733–1816) was an American militia general in the American Revolutionary War, Justice of the Rhode Island Supreme Court, Deputy Governor of Rhode Island, and Anti-Federalist leader. West also was a party in the first U.S. Supreme Court decision in 1791, West v. Barnes.

== Early life ==
William West's house in Scituate, Rhode Island, built in 1775

West was born in North Kingstown, Colony of Rhode Island in about 1733 to Alice Sweet and John West, a great-grandson of Pilgrim, George Soule. West's father was a large landowner and his mother sold "jonnycakes" during the American Revolution. West had been thought to be a descendant of Francis West of Duxbury, but now is believed is descended from Francis West who married Susannah Soule, a completely unrelated West Family line. In about 1755 West married Eleanor Brown, a daughter of Charles and Ellenor Brown, and granddaughter of Beriah Brown, who came to North Kingstown from Rowley, Massachusetts. West also served in the French and Indian War around this time. West eventually moved from North Kingstown to Scituate, Rhode Island, and purchased a 200-acre (0.81 km^{2}) farm which Governor Stephen Hopkins had previously owned. West set up a prosperous tavern in 1758 and was an active farmer and molasses trader. Soon after moving to Scituate, West became a deputy (representative) and was also elected as a representative of the town in a general convention held at East Greenwich, September 26, 1786. Between 1760 and 1785, West was elected 12 times as a representative.

== Service during the American Revolution ==
At the outbreak of the American Revolution in 1775, Colonel West was placed second in command of the Rhode Island Militia under Esek Hopkins, and West served as a brigadier general from 1775 to 1777. From January to March 1776, West assumed command at Rhode Island (Aquidneck Island) which was then under siege from the British warships in Narragansett Bay. As general, his main task was to root out Tories who were supplying the British. In March, he resigned the command at Newport in disgust after the Rhode Island legislature freed several imprisoned Newport Tory leaders, such as Joseph Wanton, Jr.

When the British army finally occupied Newport in December 1776, West retreated to Bristol with the militia. During the Battle of Rhode Island in 1778, General West led the Rhode Island militia in the unsuccessful invasion of Aquidneck Island. His troops served as reserves for the regular Continental troops and provided cover during the retreat.

West played an active role in the affairs of his town throughout the Revolution. On May 4, 1776, as a Scituate representative, West signed Rhode Island's declaration of independence, which preceded the American Declaration of Independence by two months. He was put in charge of raising troops in the Scituate in 1777 and served on various committees concerning the British blockade, army blankets, salt rationing and firearms. West was again made brigadier general of the Providence County brigade in 1779. General West was also purported to have invested in privateers during the war. Two cargoes were lost, which supposedly damaged his finances.

West was also several times chosen as the moderator of the town, as he was allegedly a man of "intelligence, and a marked degree of enterprise." During the war, West was elected Deputy Governor of Rhode Island and served from May 1780 to May 1781. As Deputy Governor, West served on a committee which was integral to the formation of the state of Vermont. Westfield, Vermont, was named after Governor West in 1780 because of his support for Vermont statehood as a legislator. West was also granted land in Vermont for his political services, which he sold in 1785 because of his financial concerns.

== Judge of Supreme Court and Anti-Federalist leader ==
West served as a justice of the Rhode Island Supreme Court (then called the Superior Court of Assize, and General Gaol Delivery) from May 1787 to May 1790. While a judge, West was also a leader in the rural opposition to the adoption of the Constitution, known as the "Country Party". The party supported honoring paper money as legal tender, and the party was in power from 1786 through 1790.

West led nearly 1,000 armed, rural citizens to Providence to protest an ox roast celebration and reading the Constitution on July 4, 1788 (shortly after the ninth state had ratified it). Fortunately, a compromise between the Federalists and Anti-Federalists was reached, and civil war was averted (the federalists agreed to celebrate only independence, not the adoption of the Constitution). The site of the ox roast rebellion was named Federal Hill. Resistance to the Constitution, however, remained strong, and Rhode Island was the last of the 13 colonies to ratify the Constitution in 1790.

== Financial troubles and death ==
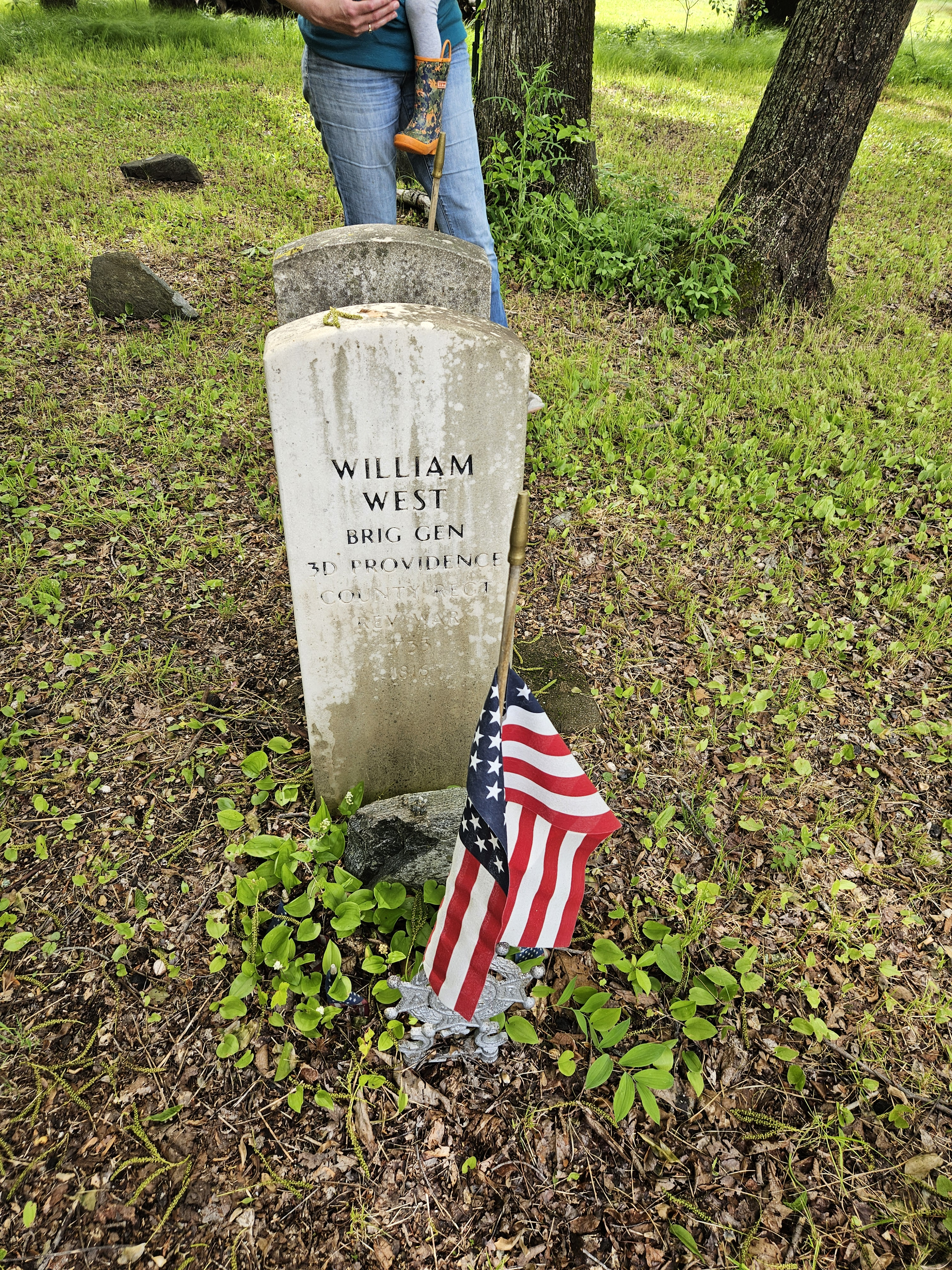
William West grave marker

Although West had been a prosperous farmer before the war, the depreciation in value of continental currency ruined him financially. In its first decision, the U.S. Supreme Court ruled in West v. Barnes (1791) that William West could not use continental currency to pay off his mortgage because of a procedural problem with his appeal. West was forced to sell his farm to his sons-in-law, Gideon Smith, Jeremy Phillips, Job Randall, and Joseph Battey resulting in further litigation after his death in West v. Randall. West was forced into debtors' prison for a period and died in relative poverty in 1816 (or 1814 according to the case, West v. Randall). West was buried on his farm in Scituate, Rhode Island near the Danielson Highway.

== Appearance ==
No depictions of West are known to exist, but he was described as "a man rather above the middle height, a bony, sinewy man, long favored, with a prominent nose."

== Family ==
He was the great-grandfather of Major General Thomas West Sherman, a career Army officer who distinguished himself during the American Civil War.

== See also ==
- Lieutenant Governors of Rhode Island

Political offices
Preceded by Jabez Bowen	Lieutenant Governors of Rhode Island; 1780–1781	Succeeded by Jabez Bowen
