= United States Reports, volume 4 =

Supreme Court of the United States
- Interactive map of Supreme Court of the United States
- 38°53′26″N 77°00′16″W
- Established: March 4, 1789; 237 years ago
- Location: Washington, D.C.
- Coordinates: 38°53′26″N 77°00′16″W
- Composition method: Presidential nomination with Senate confirmation
- Authorised by: Constitution of the United States, Art. III, § 1
- Judge term length: life tenure, subject to impeachment and removal
- Number of positions: 9 (by statute)
- Website: supremecourt.gov

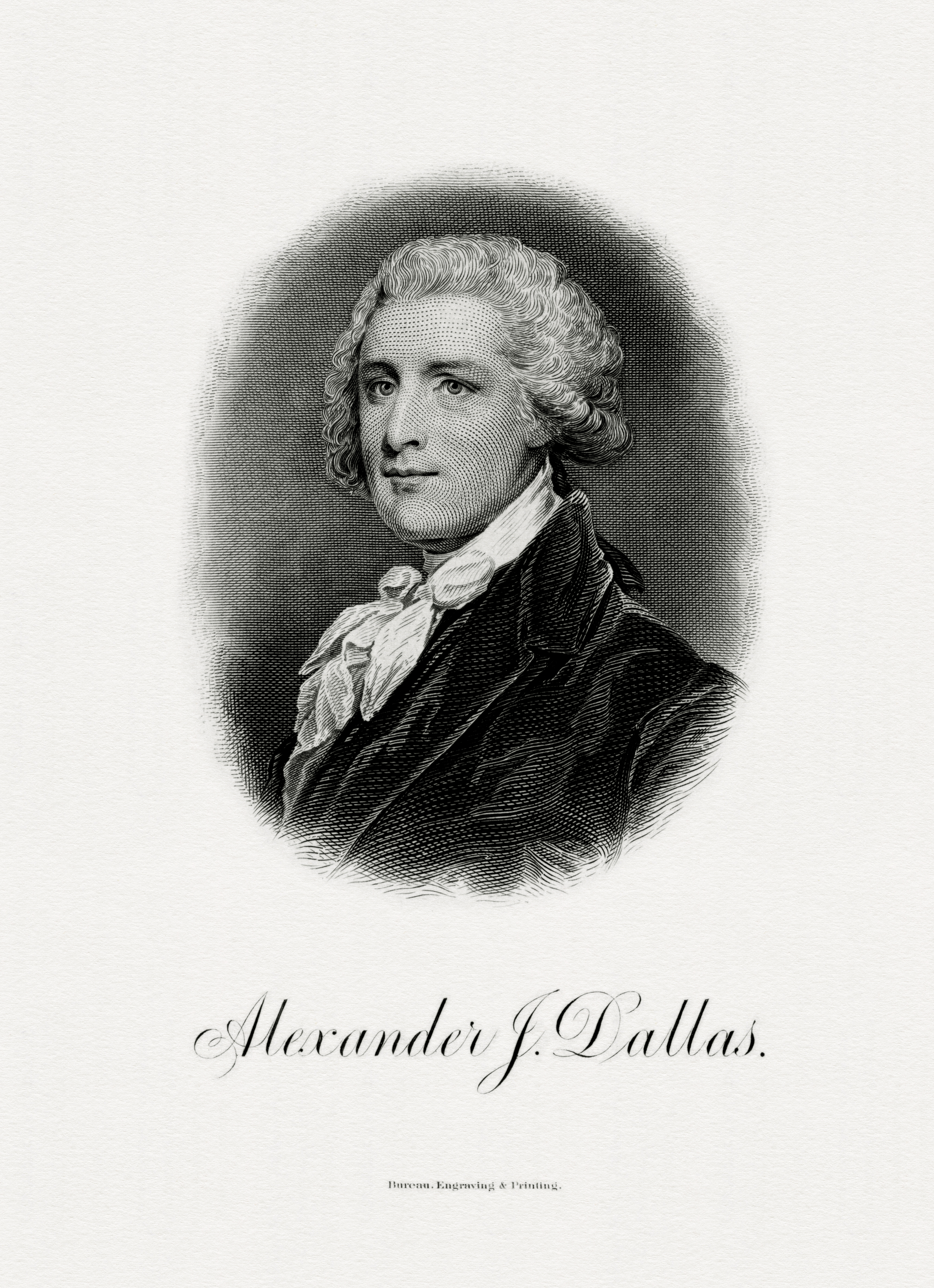
Alexander Dallas as Secretary of the Treasury (1814–1816)

This is a list of cases reported in volume 4 U.S. (4 Dall.) of United States Reports, decided by the Supreme Court of the United States in 1799 and 1800. Case reports from other tribunals also appear in 4 U.S. (4 Dall.).

== Alexander Dallas and Dallas' Reports ==
Not all of the cases reported in 4 U.S. (4 Dall.) are from the United States Supreme Court. Included are decisions from various city, state, and lower federal courts sitting in Philadelphia, dating from the colonial period and the first decade after independence, as well as reports from a state court of Delaware, and the British Privy Council in an appeal from New Hampshire. Alexander J. Dallas, a Philadelphia lawyer and later United States Secretary of the Treasury, had been in the business of reporting local law cases for newspapers and periodicals. When the US Supreme Court sat in Philadelphia from 1791 to 1800, he collected their cases as well, and later began compiling his case reports in a bound volume which he called Reports of cases ruled and adjudged in the courts of Pennsylvania, before and since the Revolution.

When the US Supreme Court along with the rest of the new federal government moved in 1791 from the former capital, New York City, to the nation's temporary capital in Philadelphia, Dallas was appointed the Supreme Court's first unofficial and unpaid Supreme Court Reporter. (Court reporters in that age received no salary, but were expected to profit from the publication and sale of their compiled decisions.) Dallas continued to collect and publish Pennsylvania and other decisions, adding federal Supreme Court cases to his reports. Dallas published four volumes of decisions during his tenure as Reporter, known as the Dallas Reports.

The Supreme Court moved to the new capital city of Washington D.C. in 1800. Dallas remained in Philadelphia; William Cranch then replaced him as Reporter of Decisions of the Supreme Court of the United States.

== Nominative reports ==
In 1874, the U.S. government created the United States Reports, and retroactively numbered older privately published case reports as part of the new series. As a result, cases appearing in volumes 1–90 of U.S. Reports have dual citation forms; one for the volume number of U.S. Reports, and one for the volume number of the reports named for the relevant reporter of decisions (these are called "nominative reports"). As such, volumes 1–4 of United States Reports correspond to volumes 1–4 of Dallas' Reports. The dual citation form of, for example, Turner v. Bank of North America is 4 U.S. (4 Dall.) 8 (1799).

== Courts in 4 U.S. (4 Dall.) ==
The cases reported in 4 U.S. (4 Dall.) come from a miscellany of tribunals in the United States and Britain: the Supreme Court of the United States; the Supreme Court of Pennsylvania (Pa.); the Pennsylvania High Court of Errors and Appeals (Pa. Ct. Err. & App.) (which from its creation in 1780 to its dissolution in 1808 was the court of last resort in the Pennsylvania judiciary); the Delaware Court of Errors and Appeals (Del. Ct. Err. & App.); the Mayor's Court of Philadelphia; the United States Circuit Court for the District of Pennsylvania (C.C.D. Pa.); the Privy Council of the United Kingdom (P.C.). (To avoid confusion, the Pennsylvania Court of Errors and Appeals will be cited as "Pa. Ct. Err. & App." rather than as "Pa.", although the latter abbreviation should be used, according to Bluebook rules, for the highest court in Pennsylvania at a particular time. Rather, "Pa." will consistently be used to indicate the Supreme Court of Pennsylvania.)

== Justices of the Supreme Court at the time of 4 U.S. (4 Dall.) ==
The Supreme Court is established by Article III, Section 1 of the Constitution of the United States, which says: "The judicial Power of the United States, shall be vested in one supreme Court . . .". The size of the Court is not specified; the Constitution leaves it to Congress to set the number of justices. Under the Judiciary Act of 1789 Congress originally fixed the number of justices at six (one chief justice and five associate justices). Since 1789 Congress has varied the size of the Court from six to seven, nine, ten, and back to nine justices (always including one chief justice).

When the cases in 4 U.S. (4 Dall.) were decided, the Court comprised six of the following seven justices at one time:

Portrait	Justice	Office	Home State	Succeeded	Date confirmed by the Senate (Vote)	Tenure on Supreme Court
	Oliver Ellsworth	Chief Justice	Connecticut	John Rutledge	March 4, 1796 (21–1)	March 8, 1796 – December 15, 1800 (Resigned)
	William Cushing	Associate Justice	Massachusetts	original seat when the Court was established	September 26, 1789 (Acclamation)	February 2, 1790 – September 13, 1810 (Died)
	James Iredell	Associate Justice	North Carolina	original seat when the Court was established	February 10, 1790 (Acclamation)	May 12, 1790 – October 20, 1799 (Died)
	William Paterson	Associate Justice	New Jersey	Thomas Johnson	March 4, 1793 (Acclamation)	March 11, 1793 – September 8, 1806 (Died)
	Samuel Chase	Associate Justice	Maryland	John Blair, Jr.	January 27, 1796 (Acclamation)	February 4, 1796 – June 19, 1811 (Died)
	Bushrod Washington	Associate Justice	Virginia	James Wilson	December 20, 1798 (Acclamation)	November 9, 1798 (Recess Appointment) – November 26, 1829 (Died)
	Alfred Moore	Associate Justice	North Carolina	James Iredell	December 9, 1799 (Acclamation)	April 21, 1800 – January 26, 1804 (Resigned)

== Notable case in 4 U.S. (4 Dall.) ==
=== New York v. Connecticut ===
New York v. Connecticut, 4 U.S. (4 Dall.) 1 (1799), is a 1799 case in the Supreme Court of the United States between the State of New York and the State of Connecticut. The case was the first in which the Supreme Court exercised its original jurisdiction under Article III of the United States Constitution to hear controversies between two states.

== Citation style ==
Under the Judiciary Act of 1789 the federal court structure at the time comprised District Courts, which had general trial jurisdiction; Circuit Courts, which had mixed trial and appellate (from the US District Courts) jurisdiction; and the United States Supreme Court, which had appellate jurisdiction over the federal District and Circuit courts—and for certain issues over state courts. The Supreme Court also had limited original jurisdiction (i.e., in which cases could be filed directly with the Supreme Court without first having been heard by a lower federal or state court). There were one or more federal District Courts and/or Circuit Courts in each state, territory, or other geographical region.

Bluebook citation style is used for case names, citations, and jurisdictions.

- "C.C.D." = United States Circuit Court for the District of . . .
  - e.g.,"C.C.D.N.J." = United States Circuit Court for the District of New Jersey
- "D." = United States District Court for the District of . . .
  - e.g.,"D. Mass." = United States District Court for the District of Massachusetts
- "E." = Eastern; "M." = Middle; "N." = Northern; "S." = Southern; "W." = Western
  - e.g.,"C.C.S.D.N.Y." = United States Circuit Court for the Southern District of New York
  - e.g.,"M.D. Ala." = United States District Court for the Middle District of Alabama
- "Ct. Cl." = United States Court of Claims
- The abbreviation of a state's name alone indicates the highest appellate court in that state's judiciary at the time.
  - e.g.,"Pa." = Supreme Court of Pennsylvania
  - e.g.,"Me." = Supreme Judicial Court of Maine

== List of cases in 4 U.S. (4 Dall.) ==
=== Cases of the Supreme Court of the United States ===
Case Name	Page & year	Opinion of the Court	Concurring opinion(s)	Dissenting opinion(s)	Lower court	Disposition
New York v. Connecticut	1 (1799)	Ellsworth	none	none	original	injunction upheld
Hazlehurst v. United States	6 (1799)	per curiam	none	none	C.C.D.S.C.	non prosequitur
Turner v. Enrille	7 (1799)	per curiam	none	none	C.C.D.S.C.	reversed
Turner v. Bank of N. Am.	8 (1799)	Ellsworth	none	none	C.C.D.S.C.	reversed
Mossman v. Higginson	12 (1800)	per curiam	none	none	C.C.D. Ga.	writ of error quashed
Cooper v. Telfair	14 (1800)	seriatim: Washington, Chase, Paterson, Cushing	none	none	C.C.D. Ga.	affirmed
Williamson v. Kincaid	20 (1800)	per curiam	none	none	C.C.D. Ga.	certification
Rutherford v. Fisher	22 (1800)	per curiam, and Chase	none	none	C.C.D.N.J.	writ of error quashed
Blair v. Miller	21 (1800)	per curiam	none	none	C.C.D. Va.	writ of error quashed
Course v. Stead	22 (1800)	per curiam	none	none	C.C.D. Ga.	reversed
Blaine v. Ship Clarles Carter	22 (1800)	per curiam	none	none	C.C.D. Va.	dismissed
Priestman v. United States	28 (1800)	per curiam, and Chase	none	none	C.C.D. Pa.	affirmed
Talbot v. Ship Amelia	34 (1800)	John Marshall (after 1801 reargument)	none	none	C.C.D.N.Y.	multiple
Bas v. Tingy	37 (1800)	seriatim: Moore, Washington, Paterson	none	none	C.C.D. Pa.	affirmed

=== Cases of other tribunals ===
Case	Page and year	Court
Ludlow v. Bingham	47 (Pa. Ct. Err. and App. 1799)	Pennsylvania High Court of Errors and Appeals
Johnson v. Haines's Lessee	55 (Pa. Ct. Err. and App. 1799)	Pennsylvania High Court of Errors and Appeals
Ewing v. Houston	58 (Pa. Ct. Err. and App. 1799)	Pennsylvania High Court of Errors and Appeals
Livezey v. Gorgas	61 (Pa. Ct. Err. and App. 1799)	Pennsylvania High Court of Errors and Appeals
Burd v. Smith	76 (Pa. Ct. Err. and App. 1802)	Pennsylvania High Court of Errors and Appeals
Lea v. Yard	95 (Pa. Ct. Err. and App. 1804)	Pennsylvania High Court of Errors and Appeals
Geyer's Lessee v. Irwin	107 (Pa. 1790)	Supreme Court of Pennsylvania
Carson v. Hood's Executors	93 (Pa. 1790)	Supreme Court of Pennsylvania
Donaldson v. Means	93 (Pa. 1791)	Supreme Court of Pennsylvania
Little v. Dawson	95 (Pa. 1791)	Supreme Court of Pennsylvania
Bradley's Lessee v. Bradley	96 (Pa. 1792)	Supreme Court of Pennsylvania
Smith v. Brodhead's Executors	99 (Pa. 1792)	Supreme Court of Pennsylvania
Pennsylvania v. Dillon	110 (Pa. 1792)	Supreme Court of Pennsylvania
Morris's Lessee v. Smith	102 (Pa. 1792)	Supreme Court of Pennsylvania
Calhoun's Lessee v. Dunning	104 (Pa. 1792)	Supreme Court of Pennsylvania
Gander's Lessee v. Burns	106 (Pa. 1792)	Supreme Court of Pennsylvania
Massey v. Leaming	107 (Pa. 1792)	Supreme Court of Pennsylvania
Vaughan v. Blanchard	108 (Pa. 1792)	Supreme Court of Pennsylvania
Pennsylvania v. Biron	109 (Pa. 1792)	Supreme Court of Pennsylvania
Bank of North America v. Pettit	110 (Pa. 1793)	Supreme Court of Pennsylvania
Stansbury v. Marks	112 (Pa. 1793)	Supreme Court of Pennsylvania
Conrad v. Conrad	113 (Pa. 1793)	Supreme Court of Pennsylvania
Edgar's Lessee v. Robinson	114 (Pa. 1793)	Supreme Court of Pennsylvania
Zantzinger v. Ketch	115 (Pa. 1793)	Supreme Court of Pennsylvania
Eddowes v. Niell	116 (Pa. 1793)	Supreme Court of Pennsylvania
Schenkhouse v. Gibbs	118 (Pa. 1794)	Supreme Court of Pennsylvania
McEwen v. Gibbs	119 (Pa. 1794)	Supreme Court of Pennsylvania
Boyd's Lessee v. Cowan	120 (Pa. 1794)	Supreme Court of Pennsylvania
Pennsylvania v. Chambre	143 (Pa. 1794)	Supreme Court of Pennsylvania
Respublica v. Bob	125 (Pa. 1795)	Supreme Court of Pennsylvania
Anonymous	147 (Pa. 1795)	Supreme Court of Pennsylvania
Holloback v. Van Buskink	127 (Pa. 1795)	Supreme Court of Pennsylvania
Graham v. Bickham	128 (Pa. 1795)	Supreme Court of Pennsylvania
Febeiger's Lessee v. Craighead	129 (Pa. 1796)	Supreme Court of Pennsylvania
Bank of North America v. Wycoff	130 (Pa. 1796)	Supreme Court of Pennsylvania
Bell v. Andrews	131 (Pa. 1796)	Supreme Court of Pennsylvania
Stroud v. Lockart	132 (Pa. 1797)	Supreme Court of Pennsylvania
Seagrove v. Redman	132 (Pa. 1797)	Supreme Court of Pennsylvania
Nicholson's Lessee v. Wallis	133 (Pa. 1798)	Supreme Court of Pennsylvania
Keppele v. Carr	155 (Pa. 1798)	Supreme Court of Pennsylvania
McClay v. Hanna	138 (Pa. 1799)	Supreme Court of Pennsylvania
Ewalt's Lessee v. Highlands	139 (Pa. 1799)	Supreme Court of Pennsylvania
Ball v. Dennison	163 (Pa. 1799)	Supreme Court of Pennsylvania
Levy v. Wallis	167 (Pa. 1799)	Supreme Court of Pennsylvania
Pemberton's Lessee v. Hicks	145 (Pa. 1799)	Supreme Court of Pennsylvania
Kesselman's Lessee v. Old	145 (Pa. 1799)	Supreme Court of Pennsylvania
Pennsylvania v. Coxe	170 (Pa. 1800)	Supreme Court of Pennsylvania
Reed v. Ingraham	146 (Pa. 1799)	Supreme Court of Pennsylvania
Jackson v. Winchester	177 (Pa. 1800)	Supreme Court of Pennsylvania
Bussy v. Donaldson	178 (Pa. 1800)	Supreme Court of Pennsylvania
Waters' Executors v. McClellan	180 (Pa. 1800)	Supreme Court of Pennsylvania
Morris's Lessee v. Neighman	182 (Pa. 1800)	Supreme Court of Pennsylvania
Bell's Lessee v. Levers	183 (Pa. 1800)	Supreme Court of Pennsylvania
Pennsylvania v. Fitch	212 (Pa. 1800)	Supreme Court of Pennsylvania
Beissell v. Sholl	211 (Pa. 1800)	Supreme Court of Pennsylvania
Chancellor v. Phillips	213 (Pa. 1800)	Supreme Court of Pennsylvania
Sharp v. Pettit	212 (Pa. 1800)	Supreme Court of Pennsylvania
Anonymous	186 (Pa. 1800)	Supreme Court of Pennsylvania
Freeman v. Ruston	186 (Pa. 1800)	Supreme Court of Pennsylvania
Hepburn's Lessee v. Levy	189 (Pa. 1800)	Supreme Court of Pennsylvania
Weitzell's Lessee v. Fry	218 (Pa. 1800)	Supreme Court of Pennsylvania
McLaughlin's Lessee v. Dawson	192 (Pa. 1800)	Supreme Court of Pennsylvania
Pollock v. Hall	222 (Pa. 1800)	Supreme Court of Pennsylvania
Mather v. Pratt	196 (Pa. 1800)	Supreme Court of Pennsylvania
Pennsylvania v. Addison	225 (Pa. 1801)	Supreme Court of Pennsylvania
Wainwright v. Crawford	197 (Pa. 1801)	Supreme Court of Pennsylvania
Austyn v. M'Lure	227 (Pa. 1801)	Supreme Court of Pennsylvania
Pennsylvania v. Dallas	200 (Pa. 1801)	Supreme Court of Pennsylvania
Falconer v. Montgomery	232 (Pa. 1802)	Supreme Court of Pennsylvania
Levy v. Bank of the United States	204 (Pa. 1802)	Supreme Court of Pennsylvania
Attorney General v. Grantees	237 (Pa. 1802)	Supreme Court of Pennsylvania
Jones v. Insurance Company of North America	213 (Pa. 1802)	Supreme Court of Pennsylvania
Cochran v. Cummings	250 (Pa. 1802)	Supreme Court of Pennsylvania
Fitzgerald v. Caldwell's Executors	218 (Pa. 1802)	Supreme Court of Pennsylvania
Pennsylvania v. Gibbs	220 (Pa. 1802)	Supreme Court of Pennsylvania
Pennsylvania v. Franklin	221 (Pa. 1802)	Supreme Court of Pennsylvania
City of Philadelphia v. Mason	266 (Pa. 1803)	Supreme Court of Pennsylvania
Black v. Wistar	231 (Pa. 1803)	Supreme Court of Pennsylvania
Mitchell v. Smith	232 (Pa. 1803)	Supreme Court of Pennsylvania
Passmore v. Pettit	235 (Pa. 1803)	Supreme Court of Pennsylvania
Bell v. Beveridge	236 (Pa. 1803)	Supreme Court of Pennsylvania
Kingston v. Girard	238 (Pa. 1803)	Supreme Court of Pennsylvania
McFadden v. Parker	239 (Pa. 1803)	Supreme Court of Pennsylvania
Sharpless v. Welsh	279 (Pa. 1803)	Supreme Court of Pennsylvania
Pennsylvania v. Baynton	244 (Pa. 1803)	Supreme Court of Pennsylvania
Williams v. Paschall	246 (Pa. 1803)	Supreme Court of Pennsylvania
Watson v. Insurance Company	246 (Pa. 1803)	Supreme Court of Pennsylvania
Crawford v. Willing	286 (Pa. 1803)	Supreme Court of Pennsylvania
Cramond v. Bank of the United States	252 (Pa. 1803)	Supreme Court of Pennsylvania
McCulloch v. Young	253 (Pa. 1803)	Supreme Court of Pennsylvania
Pennsylvania v. McKissick	254 (Pa. 1803)	Supreme Court of Pennsylvania
Crousillat v. Ball	256 (Pa. 1803)	Supreme Court of Pennsylvania
Maybin v. Coulon	298 (Pa. 1804)	Supreme Court of Pennsylvania
Deshler v. Beery	300 (Pa. 1804)	Supreme Court of Pennsylvania
Pennsylvania v. Lyon	262 (Pa. 1804)	Supreme Court of Pennsylvania
Pennsylvania v. Matlack	303 (Pa. 1804)	Supreme Court of Pennsylvania
Rundle v. Murgatroyd's Assignees	264 (Pa. 1804)	Supreme Court of Pennsylvania
Duncanson v. McLure	268 (Pa. 1804)	Supreme Court of Pennsylvania
Pennsylvania v. Franklin	316 (Pa. 1804)	Supreme Court of Pennsylvania
Welsh v. Murray	320 (Pa. 1805)	Supreme Court of Pennsylvania
Dupont v. Pichon	279 (Pa. 1805)	Supreme Court of Pennsylvania
Searight v. Calbraith	325 (C.C.D. Pa. 1796)	United States Circuit Court for the District of Pennsylvania
Smythe v. Banks	286 (C.C.D. Pa. 1797)	United States Circuit Court for the District of Pennsylvania
Maxfield's Lessee v. Levy	286 (C.C.D. Pa. 1797)	United States Circuit Court for the District of Pennsylvania
O'Hara v. Hall	340 (C.C.D. Pa. 1800)	United States Circuit Court for the District of Pennsylvania
United States v. Cooper	295 (C.C.D. Pa. 1800)	United States Circuit Court for the District of Pennsylvania
Murgatroyd v. McLure	295 (C.C.D. Pa. 1800)	United States Circuit Court for the District of Pennsylvania
Evans v. Bollen	296 (C.C.D. Pa. 1800)	United States Circuit Court for the District of Pennsylvania
Hollingsworth v. Fry	345 (C.C.D. Pa. 1800)	United States Circuit Court for the District of Pennsylvania
Thurston v. Koch	301 (C.C.D. Pa. 1800)	United States Circuit Court for the District of Pennsylvania
Hollingsworth v. Duane	307 (C.C.D. Pa. 1801)	United States Circuit Court for the District of Pennsylvania
Hurst's Lessee v. Jones	353 (C.C.D. Pa. 1801)	United States Circuit Court for the District of Pennsylvania
Penn v. Butler	364 (C.C.D. Pa. 1801)	United States Circuit Court for the District of Pennsylvania
United States v. Conyngham	358 (C.C.D. Pa. 1802)	United States Circuit Court for the District of Pennsylvania
Knox v. Greenleaf	312 (C.C.D. Pa. 1802)	United States Circuit Court for the District of Pennsylvania
Balfour's Lessee v. Meade	363 (C.C.D. Pa. 1803)	United States Circuit Court for the District of Pennsylvania
Humphries v. Blight's Assignees	320 (C.C.D. Pa. 1803)	United States Circuit Court for the District of Pennsylvania
United States v. Passmore	372 (C.C.D. Pa. 1804)	United States Circuit Court for the District of Pennsylvania
Willing v. United States	323 (C.C.D. Pa. 1804)	United States Circuit Court for the District of Pennsylvania
Hurst's Case	387 (C.C.D. Pa. 1804)	United States Circuit Court for the District of Pennsylvania
Walker v. Smith	389 (C.C.D. Pa. 1804)	United States Circuit Court for the District of Pennsylvania
Huidekoper's Lessee v. Douglass	392 (C.C.D. Pa. 1805)	United States Circuit Court for the District of Pennsylvania
Penn's Lessee v. Klyne	402 (C.C.D. Pa. 1805)	United States Circuit Court for the District of Pennsylvania
Gupp v. Brown	353 (C.C.D. Pa. 1805)	United States Circuit Court for the District of Pennsylvania
United States v. Johns	412 (C.C.D. Pa. 1806)	United States Circuit Court for the District of Pennsylvania
Symonds v. Union Insurance	358 (C.C.D. Pa. 1806)	United States Circuit Court for the District of Pennsylvania
Conframp v. Bunel	360 (C.C.D. Pa. 1806)	United States Circuit Court for the District of Pennsylvania
Russell ex rel. Crucet v. Union Insurance	362 (C.C.D. Pa. 1806)	United States Circuit Court for the District of Pennsylvania
United States v. McGill	426 (C.C.D. Pa. 1806)	United States Circuit Court for the District of Pennsylvania
Snell v. Delaware Insurance	370 (C.C.D. Pa. 1806)	United States Circuit Court for the District of Pennsylvania
Lyle v. Baker	433 (Pa. 1806)	Supreme Court of Pennsylvania
Ozeas v. Johnson	374 (Pa. 1806)	Supreme Court of Pennsylvania
Bender v. Fromberger	441 (Pa. 1806)	Supreme Court of Pennsylvania
Dutilh v. Gatliff	385 (Pa. 1806)	Supreme Court of Pennsylvania
Moliere's Lessee v. Noe	389 (Pa. 1806)	Supreme Court of Pennsylvania
Morgan v. Insurance Company of North America	393 (Pa. 1806)	Supreme Court of Pennsylvania
Sansom v. Ball	396 (Pa. 1806)	Supreme Court of Pennsylvania
Donath v. Insurance Company of North America	400 (Pa. 1806)	Supreme Court of Pennsylvania
W.B. v. Latimer	409 (Del. Ct. Err. and App. 1788)	Delaware Court of Errors and Appeals
Robinson v. Lessee of Adams	418 (Del. Ct. Err. and App. 1788)	Delaware Court of Errors and Appeals
Deering v. Parker	xxiii (P.C. 1760)	Privy Council of the United Kingdom
Pennsylvania v. Schaffer	xxv (Phila. Mayor's Ct. 1797)	Philadelphia Mayor's Court

== See also ==
- certificate of division
