= Mossman v. Higginson =

- Supreme Court of the United States

Decided August 11, 1800
- Full case name: Mossman v. Higginson
- Citations: 4 U.S. 12 (more) 4 Dall. 12; 1 L. Ed. 720; 1800 U.S. LEXIS 298

Holding
- "The parties to an equity suit must be so described on the record as to show that the court has jurisdiction. It is not enough that an alien is a party; the other party must be a citizen. A writ of error may be amended by filling the blank left for the return day, there being enough on the writ to amend by."

Court membership
- Chief Justice Oliver Ellsworth Associate Justices William Cushing · William Paterson; Samuel Chase · Bushrod Washington; Alfred Moore

Mossman v. Higginson, 4 U.S. (4 Dall.) 12 (1800), was an 1800 decision of the United States Supreme Court asserting that "The parties to an equity suit must be so described on the record as to show that the court has jurisdiction. It is not enough that an alien is a party; the other party must be a citizen. A writ of error may be amended by filling the blank left for the return day, there being enough on the writ to amend by."
