= Priestman v. United States =

- Supreme Court of the United States

Decided August 13, 1800
- Full case name: Priestman v. United States
- Citations: 4 U.S. 28 (more) 4 Dall. 28; 1 L. Ed. 727

Court membership
- Chief Justice Oliver Ellsworth Associate Justices William Cushing · William Paterson; Samuel Chase · Bushrod Washington; Alfred Moore

Priestman v. United States, 4 U.S. (4 Dall.) 28 (1800), was an 1800 decision of the United States Supreme Court asserting that "Under the 19th section of the act of February 18th, 1793, (1 Stats, at Large, 313,) goods are liable to forfeiture though they did not belong to the master, owner, or any mariner of the vessel in which they were imported, and though the duties were paid on them at the port of entry."

It was decided on August 13, 1800.
