= New York v. Connecticut =

- Supreme Court of the United States

Original jurisdiction Decided August 9, 1799
- Full case name: The State of New-York v. The State of Connecticut, et al.
- Citations: 4 U.S. 1 (more) 4 Dall. 1; 1 L. Ed. 715; 1799 U.S. LEXIS 243
- Claim: New York moved to enjoin ejectment proceedings pending in a U.S. Circuit Court involving land over which New York and Connecticut claimed jurisdiction.

Case history
- Procedural: Injunction denied, 4 U.S. 1 (1799) (Ellsworth, C.J.)

Outcome
- The State of New York was not a party to the ejectment action and had no interest at stake since the Circuit Court lacked the power to determine its claim of rights over the disputed lands. Injunction denied.

Court membership
- Chief Justice Oliver Ellsworth Associate Justices William Cushing · James Iredell; William Paterson · Samuel Chase; Bushrod Washington

Case opinion
- Majority: Ellsworth, joined by Paterson, Chase, Washington
- Cushing and Iredell took no part in the consideration or decision of the case.

New York v. Connecticut, 4 U.S. (4 Dall.) 1 (1799), was a lawsuit heard by the Supreme Court of the United States between the State of New York against the State of Connecticut in 1799 that arose from a land dispute between private parties. The case was the first case in which the Supreme Court exercised its original jurisdiction under Article III of the United States Constitution to hear controversies between two states.

== Background ==
The Connecticut Gore region was a strip of land on New York's western border with Pennsylvania. Connecticut claimed jurisdiction over the land and granted it to Jeremiah Halsey and Andrew Ward in exchange for their construction of the state house in Hartford. (The building is now known as the Old State House.)

After New York granted certain parcels within the Connecticut Gore to other individuals, the successors in title to Halsey and Ward filed an action for ejectment in the United States Circuit Court for the District of Connecticut. The defendants argued that they were residents of New York and that the land was actually in Steuben County, New York and so only state or federal courts in New York could exercise jurisdiction over the action. The plaintiffs claimed that the lands were actually in Connecticut.

The Supreme Court denied a motion to remove the cases from the Circuit Court, and New York subsequently filed a bill in equity against Connecticut and the Connecticut plaintiffs for an injunction to stay the ejectment proceedings. As part of the bill, New York submitted an agreement between the states, dated November 28, 1683, that purported to recognize New York's rights to the land.

Because the bill in equity was filed while the Connecticut General Assembly was out of session, the state never actually participated in the case. However, attorneys for the private land claimants argued that reasonable notice was not given for the injunction to be granted and that New York also lacked an interest in the proceedings to merit a stay.

== Decision ==
The Court found that notice was sufficient since a shorter period of time may be reasonable when the application for injunction is made to a court, rather than a single judge. However, the Court denied the injunction and found that New York lacked standing. It had not been a party to the suits in the lower court and had no concrete interest in the decisions. Also, it was claiming jurisdiction over the land, not title to it. The Circuit Court lacked the power to determine either its boundaries or its consequent rights.

== See also ==
- List of United States Supreme Court cases, volume 4
