= Smith v Minister for Justice and Equality =

Irish Supreme Court case

Smith v Minister for Justice and Equality [2013] IESC 4
- Coat of arms of Ireland
- Court: Supreme Court of Ireland
- Full case name: Smith v Minister for Justice and Equality & Ors [2013] IESC 4
- Decided: 1 February 2013
- Citation: [2013] IESC 4
- Transcript: https://www.bailii.org/ie/cases/IESC/2013/S4.html

Case history
- Appealed from: High Court
- Appealed to: Supreme Court

Court membership
- Judges sitting: Denham C.J., McKechnie J., Clarke J.

Case opinions
- The Supreme Court found that there were no valid grounds for challenging the Minister's decision to not revoke the deportation order against the appellant, the appeal was dismissed and judicial review was declined.
- Decision by: Justice Clarke

Keywords
- Judicial Review, Immigration,

Smith v Minister for Justice and Equality [2013] IESC 4 is a reported Irish Supreme Court case that concerned the deportation of one of the appellants, "Mr. Smith", who was a Nigerian national. The appellant argued that the deportation order made against him should be revoked by the Minister for Justice pursuant to section 3(11) of the Immigration Act 1999 for several reasons. The most notable of these was the right of a citizen (in this case the child of Mr. Smith) to have a family; as articulated by the Court of Justice of the European Union in Gerardo Ruiz Zambrano v Office national de l’emploi, a deportation order which would force a citizen of the European Union (EU) to leave the Union was contrary to the principles of EU law, as it would deprive the citizen of their right to live in the Union.

The Supreme Court decided that in this case, the right of a citizen to have a family was not enough to warrant the revocation of the deportation order, as the deportation of Mr. Smith would not force his child to leave the jurisdiction and thus would not deprive the citizen of their right to live in the Union. The court found that there were no valid grounds for challenging the Minister's decision to not revoke the deportation order against the appellant.

== Background ==
In 2002, Mr and Mrs Smith came from Nigeria to Ireland with their two children and sought asylum. This request for asylum was ultimately turned down but while their application was being processed, Mr and Mrs Smith had a son named Charles Smith on January 16, 2002. Due to the law at that time, Charles became an Irish citizen since he was born in Ireland. During the waiting period after applying for asylum, Mr Smith travelled to the United Kingdom, so he said, to bring their other children to Ireland. However while in the UK he was charged with the possession of illegal drugs and given a seven-year prison sentence. In 2005, Mr Smith was released from prison after just under three years and deported to his native country.

Meanwhile, Mrs Smith again requested asylum in Ireland. This time was the request was approved under the Irish Born Child Scheme, which allows parents to stay in the jurisdiction if their children were born in the European Economic Community before January 2005. In 2006, Mr Smith and their oldest child entered the country unlawfully. By 2010, the Department of Justice had given both of them two orders to be deported, so Mr Smith left Ireland for the UK. In 2011, lawyers for Mr Smith sent a letter to the Department of Justice claiming that Mr Smith's deportation order should be stopped due to the decision in Gerardo Ruiz Zambrano v Office national de l’emploi. The Ruiz Zambrano case concerned Mr and Mrs Ruiz Zambrano who were two Columbian nationals residing in Belgium. A deportation order had been made against them but they did not leave the country. Mrs Zambrano then gave birth to a child, making them the parents of an EU citizen. The court decided that a deportation order which would force a child who is a Union citizen to leave the Union took away that citizen's right to live in the Union and was thus contrary to EU law. The effect of this decision meant that it was more difficult for a deportation order made against the parents of child who was an EU citizen to be carried out, when that child would be forced to leave with the parents.

With regard to Mr Smith claims, the Minister for Justice and Equality was not convinced that the decision in Ruiz Zambrano applied here, as his son Charles had lived in Ireland with his mother since he was born and the deportation of his father would not force him leave. In October 2011, Mr Smith's oldest son, who had been living in Ireland without permission, received permission to stay until 2014. Mr Smith's request to stay was turned down. Mr Smith then made a second request against the order, claiming that Charles was dependent on him. This request was also denied, and the Minister relied the case of Murat Dereci and Others v Bundesministerium für Inneres to support his decision. In the Dereci case, it was decided that although it was easier for the citizen to keep his or her family together, this did not mean that the citizen's rights would be taken away if the deportation order went through.

The High Court in Smith & Ors v The Minister for Justice and Equality & Ors agreed with the rationale Minister and decided that the deportation order need not be revoked.

== Holding of the Supreme Court ==
The Court affirmed the previous High Court decision by not quashing said decision and by denying a grant of judicial review. There were several reasons for this. Firstly, the court accepted that applicants may ask for the revocation of a deportation order under the Immigration Act 1999 if their situation has changed between the time of the deportation order and the time of the application. The court decided that the only change was that permission was given to Mr and Mrs Smith's oldest son to stay in the country. Secondly, the court was not convinced by the appellant's arguments that relied on the English case of Sanade & Others v Secretary of State for the Home Department.

When asked, the secretary said that the fact that the appellants wanted to take their child with them could not be used to get around Article 8 of the European Convention on Human Rights which protects a person's right to a family. Mr Smith brought up this case and also said that the Minister for Justice hadn't given it enough thought. The court disregarded this argument. The Minister sent a 38-page memorandum with all of the reasons to deport Mr Smith. Also, Mr Smith didn't use these reasons at the time of the deportation order; he got around the order by leaving the country illegally and coming back into the UK. The court also said that EU law did not apply as it was only about one state's right to send someone to a country that wasn't in the EU. It also said that the Minister's decision not to apply the Zambrano ruling did not need to be amended as nothing had changed since the first correct ruling. Therefore, the application for appeal was denied.
