= Hazlehurst v. United States =

- Supreme Court of the United States

Decided August 9, 1799
- Full case name: Hazlehurst, et al. v. United States
- Citations: 4 U.S. 6 (more) 4 Dall. 6; 1 L. Ed. 717; 1799 U.S. LEXIS 244

Holding
- orders of non prosequitur for failure to appear

Court membership
- Chief Justice Oliver Ellsworth Associate Justices William Cushing · James Iredell; William Paterson · Samuel Chase; Bushrod Washington

Hazlehurst v. United States, 4 U.S. (4 Dall.) 6 (1799), was a 1799 decision of the United States Supreme Court asserting that the appellants' (several similar cases were combined) failures to appear in court regarding their writs of error resulted in the Court issuing a orders of non prosequitur. The case was a federal case from South Carolina disputing their written seal on a bond which was purportedly improper because a wax seal was required.

== Opinion of the Court ==
In error from the circuit court for the district of South Carolina. A rule had been obtained by Lee, the attorney-general, at the opening of the court, that the plaintiffs appear and prosecute their writ of error within the term, or suffer a non-pros.: but it was found, that errors had been assigned in the court below, and a joinder in error entered here. The rule was, therefore, changed to the following: " that unless the plaintiffs in error appear and argue the errors tomorrow, a non-pros, be entered." The plaintiffs not appearing, the writ of error was non-prossed, according to the rule.
