= Courts of Pennsylvania =

Courts of Pennsylvania include:

State courts of Pennsylvania

- Supreme Court of Pennsylvania
  - Superior Court of Pennsylvania (3 districts)
  - Commonwealth Court of Pennsylvania
    - Pennsylvania Courts of Common Pleas (60 judicial districts)
      - Magisterial District Courts

Former colonial and state courts of Pennsylvania

- Provincial Court (1684-1722)
- Orphans' Courts (1688-1968 when merged with Courts of Common Pleas)
- Justice of the Peace Courts (1682 - now Magisterial District Courts)
- Court for the Trial of Negroes (1700-1780)
- District Courts (1811-1873)
- County Courts (1682-1722)
- Court of Chancery (1720-1735)
- High Court of Errors and Appeals (1780-1808)
  - Court of Admiralty (1697-1789)
  - Register's Courts
- Courts of Quarter Sessions of the Peace (1682–1969)
- Courts of Oyer and Terminer and General Gaol Delivery (1802-1910)

Federal courts located in Pennsylvania

- United States Court of Appeals for the Third Circuit (headquartered in Philadelphia, having jurisdiction over the United States District Courts of Delaware, New Jersey, Pennsylvania, and the United States Virgin Islands)
  - United States District Court for the Eastern District of Pennsylvania
  - United States District Court for the Middle District of Pennsylvania
  - United States District Court for the Western District of Pennsylvania

Former federal courts located in Pennsylvania

- Court of Appeals in Cases of Capture (1780-1787)
- United States District Court for the District of Pennsylvania (1789-1815 when it was subdivided)

== See also ==
- Unified Judicial System of Pennsylvania
