= Turner v. Enrille =

- Supreme Court of the United States

Argued August 7, 1799 Decided August 9, 1799
- Full case name: Thomas Turner, Administrator of Wright Stanley v. Marquis de Caso Enrille
- Citations: 4 U.S. 7 (more) 4 Dall. 7; 1 L. Ed. 717; 1799 U.S. LEXIS 245

Case history
- Prior: Error from the Circuit Court of South-Carolina

Holding
- The Court affirmed the decision in Bingham v. Cabot, et al. (3 D. 382) and reversed the judgment because the record did not show the alienage of the plaintiff below, nor the citizenship of the defendants.

Court membership
- Chief Justice Oliver Ellsworth Associate Justices William Cushing · James Iredell; William Paterson · Samuel Chase; Bushrod Washington

Turner v. Enrille, 4 U.S. (4 Dall.) 7 (1799), was a 1799 decision of the United States Supreme Court. The Supreme Court "affirmed the decision in Bingham v. Cabot, et al. (3 D. 382) and reversed the judgment because the record did not show the alienage of the plaintiff below, nor the citizenship of the defendants."
