= Course v. Stead =

- Supreme Court of the United States

Decided February 8, 1800
- Full case name: Course v. Stead
- Citations: 4 U.S. 22 (more) 4 Dall. 22; 1 L. Ed. 724

Court membership
- Chief Justice Oliver Ellsworth Associate Justices William Cushing · William Paterson; Samuel Chase · Bushrod Washington

Course v. Stead, 4 U.S. (4 Dall.) 22 (1800), was an 1800 decision of the United States Supreme Court in which the court held that "A writ of error, tested in the vacation after the last term, is amendable. The omission of the name of the district in the address of the writ is not material if the indorsement and attestation show the district. If the value of the matter in dispute does not appear, it may be shown by affidavit. If a new party and subject-matter are brought before the court by a supplemental bill, it must show that the court has jurisdiction by reason of the citizenship of the parties to that bill." The decision also held that the Supreme Court could take judicial notice of state laws without the laws having to be proved proved as fact in lower courts.

It was decided on February 8, 1800.

== Later developments ==
Course was an early case about appellate jurisdiction from the court, and it reflects a looser interpretation of what jurisdiction means than modern jurisprudence does. During the American Civil War era, the Taney Court transformed these sorts of technical issues into serious impediments to courts' adjudicative powers.

The case returned to the Supreme Court in Stead's Executors v. Course, 8 U.S. 403 (1808).
