= James Smith (Pennsylvania politician) =

American Founding Father and politician (c. 1719 – 1806)

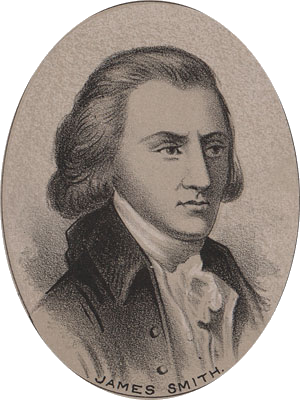

Delegate from Pennsylvania to the Continental Congress
- In office July 1776 – March 1777
- Member, Board of War
- In office December 1777 – November 1778

Member of the Pennsylvania House of Representatives
- In office 1780

Judge of the Pennsylvania High Court of Errors and Appeals
- In office November 1780 – May 1781

Personal details
- Born: c. 1719 (Note: Sources offer a wide range of dates between 1713 and 1722 for Smith's birth, and several acknowledge that his birth date is uncertain. The most commonly cited date is 1719; other sources indicate 1713 and 1720, with degrees of uncertainty. According to John Sanderson, Smith's birthdate "was a secret which he carried with him to the grave, an invincible reluctance to reveal his age, even to his nearest relatives or most confidential friends, being one of his peculiarities which remained after he had long survived the period when vanity or interest could possibly supply a motive for it. It was believed by some members of his family that he was born in the year 1713, while others would place that event eight or nine years later; the truth lies between these two conjectures.") Ulster, Ireland
- Died: July 11, 1806 York, Pennsylvania, U.S.
- Resting place: First Presbyterian Churchyard, York
- Occupation: Lawyer, surveyor
- Known for: Signer of the United States Declaration of Independence
- Military career
- Allegiance: United States
- Branch: Pennsylvania Militia
- Service years: 1774–1801
- Rank: Brigadier general

James Smith (c. 1719 – July 11, 1806) was an Irish-born American lawyer and surveyor. As a signer of the United States Declaration of Independence during his term as a delegate to the Second Continental Congress from Pennsylvania, he is remembered as a Founding Father of the United States.

Smith immigrated to Pennsylvania with his family as a boy and settled in the Susquehanna River valley. After training as a lawyer and working as a surveyor on the frontier, he settled in York, where he practiced law and was involved in several business activities. During the early years of the American Revolution, Smith became an advocate for independence from Great Britain. As a member of the Committee for the province of Pennsylvania, he helped draft instructions for Pennsylvania's delegates to the First Continental Congress urging them to pursue solidarity with other colonies and defend the liberties of the colonists. He also led the raising of Pennsylvania's first volunteer militia.

As a delegate to the Pennsylvania Provincial Conference in 1776, Smith advanced a resolution calling for independence shortly before the Second Continental Congress adopted the Declaration of Independence on July 4. The U.S. Declaration was modeled in the substance of its complaints on the Pennsylvania resolution. Smith was elected to the Second Continental Congress shortly afterward and in this capacity affixed his signature to the engrossed copy of the Declaration. As a member of Congress, he served on the Board of War, supporting the Continental war effort against Britain. Smith left the Continental Congress in 1778 and returned to his law practice. He continued to serve in various public offices in Pennsylvania and remained active in public affairs until his death in 1806.

== Early life and education ==
Smith was born in Ulster, Ireland c. 1719. The second son in a large family, he emigrated with his family from Ireland to Pennsylvania in 1729, where his father farmed along the Susquehanna River. He studied Latin, Greek and surveying under Presbyterian clergyman Francis Alison at his academy in New London, Pennsylvania. Smith studied law at the office of his elder brother George, or with a Lancaster attorney named Thomas Cookson, and was admitted to the bar in Pennsylvania.

== Early career, marriage and family ==
Smith initially practiced law near what was then the frontier outpost of Shippensburg, although he had little legal business and his primary activity was surveying. After a few years at Shippensburg, he settled in York, where he was for many years the only lawyer practicing.

In York, Smith lived on South George Street, where he owned the block opposite the historic Christ Lutheran Church. His office was located at the intersection of George Street and Mason Alley. Smith married Eleanor Armor (c. 1729–July 13, 1818) of New Castle, Delaware, c. 1757–1760. They had five children born between 1761 and 1769. He was a Presbyterian.

== Revolutionary activity ==
In 1774, amid growing tensions between colonial governments and Great Britain, and after the blockade of Boston, a Committee for the province of Pennsylvania convened in Philadelphia in July. Smith was a delegate from York County and was an early advocate for independence.

While the committee's resolves expressed loyalty to King George III and regret over the "dissension" between the colonies and Britain, they also conveyed a desire for their rights as Englishmen to be respected and expressed solidarity with the people of Boston and support for commitments of non-importation of goods from Britain. The pro-independence Smith was one of three committee members who penned instructions to Pennsylvania's deputies to the coming First Continental Congress. The committee directed them to seek the repeal of the Intolerable Acts by Parliament, as well as commitments not to interfere with internal legislation or regulating trade. "Honour, justice, and humanity call for us to hold, and to transmit to our posterity, that liberty, which we received from our ancestors. It is not our duty to leave wealth to our children: But it is our duty, to leave liberty to them," the instructions said. The committee's instructions made only oblique reference to armed resistance to Britain.

Smith returned to York and began raising a militia for Pennsylvania, the first volunteer soldier corps organized in the commonwealth. Smith served as captain of the militia, alongside fellow officers Thomas Hartley, David Grier and Henry Miller. After the company he recruited had reached the size of a regiment, Smith relinquished command to younger men and accepted an honorary title as colonel. Occupied with forming the militia, Smith did not attend the First Continental Congress in 1774.

== Second Continental Congress ==
Smith was elected to the Pennsylvania provincial convention in Philadelphia in January 1775, where he supported resolutions to implement the non-importation resolves of the First Continental Congress. When delegates to Congress were reelected in November 1775, they were still directed not to support a move toward independence. Smith, however, had already moved into the pro-independence camp. As pro-independence sentiment surged in Pennsylvania during the first half of 1776, Smith was elected to the Pennsylvania Provincial Conference, which was convened to draft a new constitution for the commonwealth starting in June 1776. On June 23, Benjamin Rush moved, and Smith seconded, a resolution calling for a committee to prepare a statement "declaring the sense of the conference with respect to an independence of this province from the crown and parliament of Great Britain." This document, issued the following day, provided a framework employed by the Declaration of Independence adopted by the Second Continental Congress on July 4.

While Congress was voting on independence, Smith returned to York to deal with his business affairs. However, after Congress declared independence, Smith was elected to Pennsylvania's constitutional convention. This convention assembled on July 15, and five days later it elected nine members, including Smith, to the Second Continental Congress. The Declaration of Independence had not been signed by all congressional delegates after its adoption on July 4, but as part of the Declaration's being entered into the journal of the Congress, delegates were asked to sign the engrossed copy. Even though Smith had not been present for the July 4 vote, as a member of the Continental Congress he signed the Declaration alongside other delegates on August 2, 1776. He remained a member of the constitutional convention as it completed its work.

When British advances in New Jersey and Pennsylvania in the second half of 1776 forced Congress to relocate to Baltimore, Smith supported measures to grant additional authority to George Washington as commander-in-chief. He declined reelection to the Congress in March 1777 in order to deal with his business affairs at home, including his unprofitable investment in an ironworks. However, amid the challenges the United States faced in the Philadelphia campaign in late 1777, Smith accepted reelection to the Continental Congress in December of that year. Due to the all-encompassing nature of his duties on the Board of War and the Committee of Foreign Affairs—as well as the social requirements of entertaining his fellow delegates during Congress's sojourn in his hometown of York and hosting the Board of War meetings in his offices—Smith closed his private law practice during this time. He stepped down from Congress in November 1778 and resumed his law practice.

== Later life ==
In the 1780s, Smith continued to serve in public office. He was a Pennsylvania state representative in 1780. He served on the commonwealth's Pennsylvania High Court of Errors and Appeals from November 1780 to May 1781 and was named brigadier general of militia in 1782. In 1784, Pennsylvania appointed him counsel in a case against Connecticut before the Congressional Court of Appeals. Smith was elected to Congress in 1785 but declined to accept the office due to his advanced age.

In addition to his law practice, Smith served as trustee of the York County Academy and an assistant burgess and owned an unprofitable ironworks on Codorus Creek. He lost a significant sum of £5,000 (equivalent to £688,509 in 2025) in the ironworks, which he blamed on his business partners. However, his personal fortune recovered during his law practice between 1781 and 1800, when he retired.

Smith's law office burned in 1805, destroying all of his collected correspondence with Benjamin Franklin, Samuel Adams and other Founding Fathers. He died on July 11, 1806, and was buried in the First Presbyterian Churchyard in York. He was survived by one son and one daughter.

== Legacy ==
Smith was remembered by his peers for his conviviality, lively wit and droll storytelling. He was also remembered as an eccentric; John Sanderson described him as "perhaps the most eccentric in character of the illustrious men that had the happiness to affix their names to the Declaration of Independence."

In 2006, the University of Delaware dedicated a dormitory bearing Smith's name.

== See also ==
- Memorial to the 56 Signers of the Declaration of Independence
