= Motion (legal) =

Procedural device in United States law

In United States law, a motion is a procedural device to bring a limited, contested issue before a court for decision. It is a request to the judge (or judges) to make a decision about the case. Motions may be made at any point in administrative, criminal or civil proceedings, although that right is regulated by court rules which vary from place to place. The party requesting the motion is the moving party or movant. The party opposing the motion is the nonmoving party or nonmovant.

== Process ==
In the United States, as a general rule, courts do not have the self-executing power to deliver justice in its most abstract sense, by independently investigating the facts and law of a case and drawing their own conclusions as to the fairest outcomes for each case. That type of approach to justice is known as the inquisitorial system. Rather, they operate under the adversarial system and adhere to the principle of party presentation. The principle of party presentation means that the courts rely on the parties and their counsel to present contested issues of fact or law for resolution, and then the courts rule on the issues thus presented.

In other words, in order for the court to rule on a contested issue in a case before it, one of the parties or a third party must bring an appropriate motion asking for a particular order. Some motions may be made in the form of an oral request in open court, which is then either summarily granted or denied orally by the court. This is still common with motions made during trial.

Today, however, most motions (especially on important or dispositive issues that could decide the entire case) are decided after oral argument preceded by the filing and service of legal papers. That is, the movant is usually required to serve advance written notice along with a written legal argument and a supporting factual foundation to explain why the movant is entitled to the relief requested. The legal argument usually comes in the form of a memorandum of points and authorities, while the evidence of the facts supporting the legal argument is normally supplied in the form of affidavits or declarations under penalty of perjury (which may in turn authenticate attached documentary exhibits).

A few U.S. states have a tradition in which the legal argument comes in the form of an affidavit from the attorney, speaking personally as himself on behalf of their client. In contrast, in most U.S. states, the memorandum is written impersonally, or as if the client were speaking directly to the court, and the attorney reserves declarations of their own personal knowledge to a separate affidavit or declaration (which are then cited to in the memorandum). One U.S. state, Missouri, uses the unique term "suggestions" for the memorandum of points and authorities.

Either way, the nonmovant usually has the opportunity to file and serve papers opposing the motion. In addition, most jurisdictions allow for time for the movant to file reply papers rebutting the arguments made in the opposition.

Customs vary widely as to whether oral argument is optional or mandatory once briefing in writing is complete. Some courts issue tentative rulings before the hearing (after which the losing party may demand oral argument) while others do not. Depending upon the type of motion and the jurisdiction, the court may simply issue an oral decision from the bench (possibly accompanied by a request to the winner to draft an order for the judicial officer's signature reducing the salient points to writing), take the matter under submission and draft a lengthy written decision and order, direct the clerk to record the decision in summary form in the minutes of the court (that is, a "minute order" which might record only the disposition of the motion and not the court's reasons), or simply fill out a standard court form with check boxes for different outcomes. The court may serve all parties directly with its decision or may serve only the winner and order the winner to serve everyone else in the case.

== Types ==
=== U.S. federal courts ===
==== To dismiss ====
A "motion to dismiss" asks the court to decide that a claim, even if true as stated, is not one for which the law offers a legal remedy. As an example, a claim that the defendant failed to greet the plaintiff while passing the latter on the street, insofar as no legal duty to do so may exist, would be dismissed for failure to state a valid claim: the court must assume the truth of the factual allegations, but may hold that the claim states no cause of action under the applicable substantive law. A claim that has been presented after the statute of limitations has expired is also subject to dismissal. If granted, the claim is dismissed without any evidence being presented by the other side. A motion to dismiss has taken the place of the common law demurrer in most modern civil practice. When a court dismisses a case, many laypeople state the case was "thrown out."

Under Rule 12 of the Federal Rules of Criminal Procedure, a party may raise by motion any defense, objection, or request that the court can determine without a trial of the general issue. Before the trial starts, the motions can be based on defects in instituting the prosecution, defects in the indictment or information (which can be challenged at any stage but are generally raised before a trial begins). Pleadings in a federal criminal proceeding are the indictment, the information, and the pleas of not guilty, guilty, and nolo contendere. A motion under Rule 14 can address the statement of the charges (or individual specifications, see below) or the defendants. In these instances, the motion to dismiss is characterized as a "motion to sever charges or defendants."

Under Rule 907, (Rules for Courts-Martial), a motion to dismiss is a request to terminate further proceedings on one or more criminal charges and specifications on grounds capable of resolution without trial of the general issue of guilt. A motion may be based on nonwaivable grounds (e.g. lack of jurisdiction or the failure to state an offense) or waivable grounds (denial of a right to a speedy trial, statute of limitation, double jeopardy meaning a person has been previously tried by court-martial or federal civilian court for the same offense, pardon or grant of immunity). Specifications are sometimes referred to as 'counts' or separate instances of a particular offense which are connected to specific factual evidence. A motion may seek to dismiss these specifications, especially if it is so defective it substantially misled the accused, or it is multiplicious.

Multiplicity, also known as allied offenses of similar import, is the situation where two or more allegations allege the same offense, or a situation where one defined offense necessarily includes another. Accounts may also be multiplicious if two or more describe substantially the same misconduct in different ways. For example, assault and disorderly conduct may be multiplicious if facts and evidence presented at trial prove that the disorderly conduct consists solely of the assault. That is to say, if all the elements contained in one are all in another they are allied offenses of similar import.

Discovery motions relate to the necessary exchange of information between the parties. In the common law system, these motions capture an irreducible tension in the legal system between the right of discovery and a duty to disclose information to another.

There are numerous practical differences between the discovery expectations and practices in civil and criminal proceedings. The local rules of many courts clarify expectations with respect to civil discovery, in part because these are often poorly understood or are abused as part of a trial strategy. As a result, civil discovery rules pertain to discretionary discovery practices and much of the argument in this respect centers on the proper definition of the scope of the parties requests. Because criminal prosecutions generally implicate a well-defined constitutional guarantee, criminal discovery is much more focused on automatic disclosure principles, which if found to be violated, will trigger the dismissal of the charges.

Rules 7.1 and 26-37 of the Federal Rules of Civil Procedure, are often cited in combination with a specific local rule to form a basis for a civil discovery motion.

Rule 16, Federal Rules of Criminal Procedure, is the basis for a criminal discovery motion. Rule 906(b)(7), Rules for Courts-Martial a variety of a "motion for appropriate relief" is used as a military law basis for discovery.

==== For summary judgment ====
A "motion for summary judgment" asks the court to decide that the available evidence, even if taken in the light most favorable to the non-moving party, supports a ruling in favor of the moving party. This motion is usually only made when sufficient time for discovering all evidence has expired. For summary judgment to be granted in most jurisdictions, a two-part standard must be satisfied: (i) no genuine issue of material fact can be in dispute between the parties, and (ii) the moving party must be entitled to judgment as a matter of law. For example, a claim that a doctor engaged in malpractice by prescribing a drug could result in summary judgment if the plaintiff failed to obtain expert testimony indicating that the drug was improperly prescribed. Motions to dismiss and motions for summary judgment are types of dispositive motions.

Rule 56, Federal Rules of Civil Procedure, is the rule which explains the mechanics of a summary judgment motion. As explained in the notes to this rule, summary judgment procedure is a method for promptly disposing of actions in which there is no genuine issue as to any material fact. Prior to its introduction in the US in 1934, it was used in England for more than 50 years.

In England motions for summary judgments were used only in cases of liquidated claims, there followed a steady enlargement of the scope of the remedy until it was used in actions to recover land or chattels and in all other actions at law, for liquidated or unliquidated claims, except for a few designated torts and breach of promise of marriage. English Rules Under the Judicature Act (The Annual Practice, 1937) O. 3, r. 6; Orders 14, 14A, and 15; see also O. 32, r. 6, authorizing an application for judgment at any time upon admissions. New York was a leader in the adoption of this rule in the US and the success of the method helps account for its current importance as an almost indispensable tool in administrative actions (especially before the Equal Employment Opportunity Commission which adjudicates employment discrimination claims and the Merit Systems Protection Board which adjudicates federal employment matters).

The Civil Litigation Management Manual published by the US Judicial Conference directs that these motions be filed at the optimum time and warns that premature motions can be a waste of time and effort. The significant resources needed to prepare and defend against such motions is a major factor which influences litigants to use them extensively. In many cases, particularly from the defendant's (or defense) perspective, accurate or realistic estimates of the costs and risks of an actual trial are made only after a motion has been denied. Overbroad motions for summary judgment are sometimes designed to make the opponent rehearse their case before trial.

Most summary judgment motions must be filed in accordance with specific rules relating to the content and quality of the information presented to the judge. Among other things, most motions for summary judgment will require or include: page limits on submissions by counsel; an instruction to state disputed issues of fact up front; an instruction to state whether there is a governing case; an instruction that all summary judgment motions be accompanied by electronic versions (on a CD-R or DVD-R), in a chambers-compatible format that includes full pinpoint citations and complete deposition and affidavit excerpts to aid in opinion preparation; an instruction that all exhibits submitted conform to specific physical characteristics (i.e. be tabbed with letters or numbers, that pages be sequentially numbered or "Bates-stamped"); an instruction that citations to deposition or affidavit testimony must include the appropriate page or paragraph numbers and that citations to other documents or materials must include pinpoint citations. Many judges also ask the parties to prepare form orders with a brief statements of law to help the judge write the decision. A judge generally issues a tentative ruling on the submitted pleadings, and counsel will be offered an opportunity to respond in a later oral argument. Alternatively, a judge may grant requests for argument in a preargument order which specifies what points will be discussed prior to a decision.

==== In limine ====
A "motion in limine" asks the court to decide that certain evidence may or may not be presented to the jury at the trial. A motion in limine generally addresses issues which would be prejudicial for the jury to hear in open court, even if the other side makes a timely objection which is sustained, and the judge instructs the jury to disregard the evidence. For example, the defendant may ask the court to rule that evidence of a prior conviction that occurred a long time ago should not be allowed into evidence at the trial because it would be more prejudicial than probative. If the motion is granted, then evidence regarding the conviction could not be mentioned in front of the jury, without first approaching the judge outside of the hearing of the jury and obtaining permission. The violation of a motion in limine can result in the court declaring a mistrial.

There are three types of motions in limine:

- Inclusionary - A motion asking the court to have something included in the trial.
- Exclusionary - A motion asking the court to have something excluded in the trial.
- Preclusionary - A motion asking the court to have something precluded in the trial

==== For a directed verdict ====
A "motion for a directed verdict" asks the court to rule that the plaintiff or prosecutor has not proven the case, and there is no need for the defense to attempt to present evidence. This motion is made after the plaintiff has rested its case, and prior to the defense presenting any evidence. If granted, the court would dismiss the case.

==== For judgment n.o.v. ====
A "motion for judgment n.o.v." (non obstante veredicto, or notwithstanding the verdict) asks the court to reverse the jury's verdict on the grounds that the jury could not reasonably have reached such a verdict. This motion is made after the jury's verdict. If granted, the court enters a new verdict. This motion can be used in a criminal case only to reverse a guilty verdict; not guilty verdicts are immune to reversal by the court.

Under Rule 50, Federal Rules of Civil Procedure, the motion for directed verdict and JNOV have been replaced by the motion for judgment as a matter of law (JMOL), which can be made at the close of the opposing party's evidence and "renewed" after return of the verdict (or after the dismissal of a hung jury).

Under Rule 29, Federal Rules of Criminal Procedure the "motion for a judgment of acquittal," or Rule 917, Rules for Courts-Martial the "motion for a finding of not guilty," if the evidence presented by the prosecution is insufficient to support a rational finding of guilty, there is no reason to submit the issue to a jury.

==== For new trial ====
A motion for new trial asks to overturn or set aside a court's decision or jury verdict. Such a motion is proposed by a party who is dissatisfied with the end result of a case. This motion must be based on some vital error in the court's handling of the trial, such as the admission or exclusion of key evidence, or an incorrect instruction to the jury. Generally the motion is filed within a short time after the trial (7–30 days) and is decided prior to the lodging of an appeal. In some jurisdictions, a motion for new trial which is not ruled upon by a set period of time automatically is deemed to be denied.

==== To set aside judgment ====
A "motion to set aside judgment" asks the court to vacate or nullify a judgment or verdict. Motions may be made at any time after entry of judgment, and in some circumstances years after the case has been closed by the courts. Generally the grounds for the motion cannot be ones which were previously considered when deciding a motion for new trial or on an appeal of the judgment.

==== For nolle prosequi ====
A "motion for nolle prosequi" ("not prosecuting") is a motion by a prosecutor or other plaintiff to drop legal charges. n. Latin for "we do not wish to prosecute," which is a declaration made to the judge by a prosecutor in a criminal case (or by a plaintiff in a civil lawsuit) either before or during trial, meaning the case against the defendant is being dropped. The statement is an admission that the charges cannot be proved, that evidence has demonstrated either innocence or a fatal flaw in the prosecution's claim, or the district attorney has become convinced the accused is innocent. It should be distinguished from the motion for judgment of non prosequitur, or judgment of non pros, which is a motion in some jurisdictions (e.g. Pennsylvania) by a defendant for a judgment in his favor for failure of the plaintiff to timely prosecute his claim.

==== To compel ====
A "motion to compel" asks the court to order either the opposing party or a third party to take some action. This sort of motion most commonly deals with discovery disputes, when a party who has propounded discovery to either the opposing party or a third party believes that the discovery responses are insufficient. The motion to compel is used to ask the court to order the non-complying party to produce the documentation or information requested or to sanction the non-complying party for their failure to comply with the discovery requests.
