= Pennsylvania High Court of Errors and Appeals =

Former supreme court of Pennsylvania

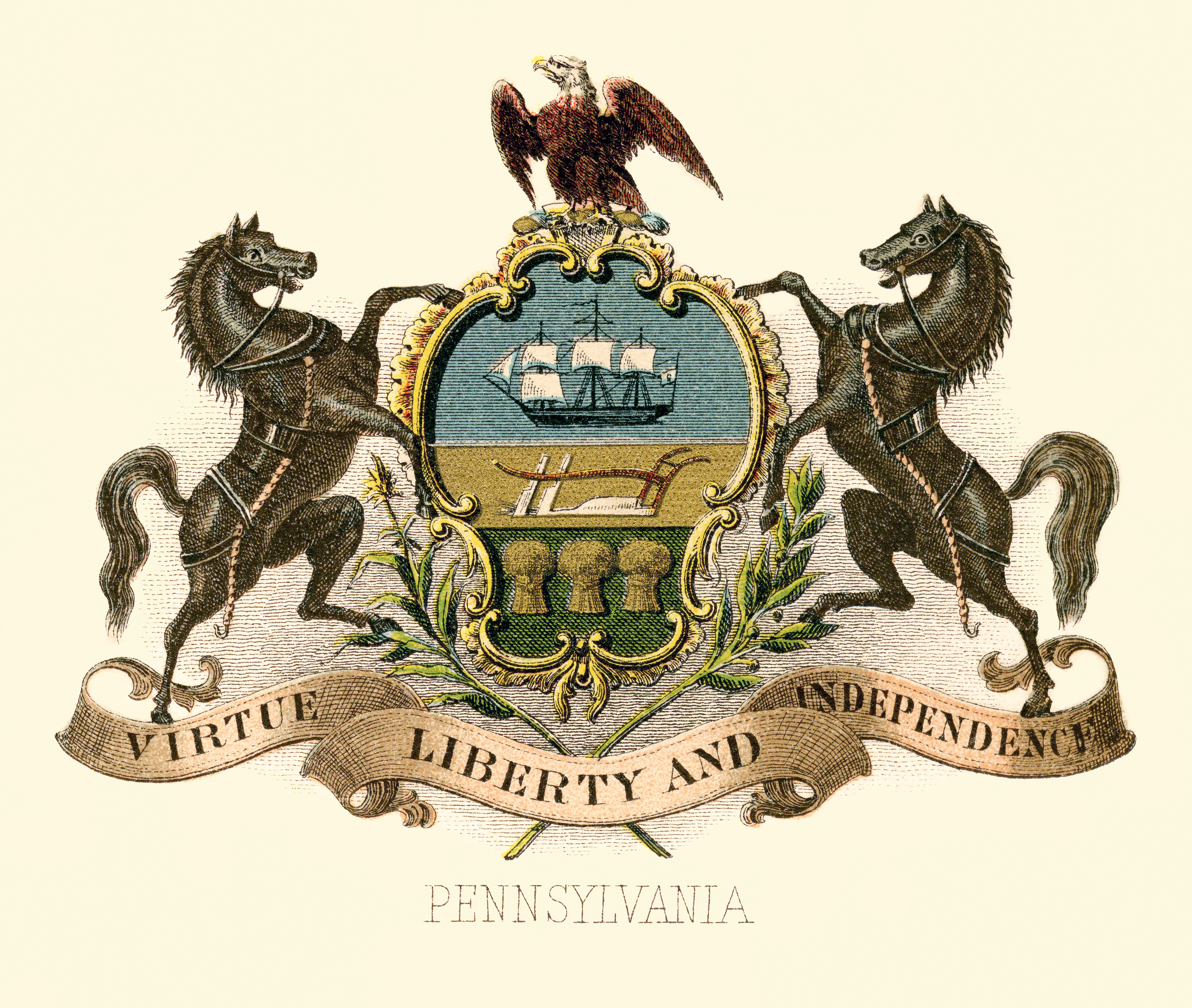
- Established: 1780
- Location: Philadelphia
- Authorised by: statute of Pennsylvania General Assembly

The Pennsylvania High Court of Errors and Appeals was a public tribunal existing from 1780 to 1808; it was the court of last resort in the Commonwealth. The Pennsylvania General Assembly created it during the American Revolution to take the place of the British Appeals Committee of the Privy Council. The High Court heard cases from the Supreme Court of Pennsylvania and other lower state courts. Eventually the General Assembly voted to abolish the High Court, effective in 1808, and transfer its powers to the state supreme court.

== Establishment ==
[I]t is requisite that the good people of this commonwealth, who have adopted the common law of England, should enjoy the full benefit thereof by the erection of a competent jurisdiction within this state for the hearing, determining and judging in the last instance upon complaints of error at common law; and also . . . of the court of admiralty . . . and likewise . . . of the several registers of wills and for granting administrations.

— An Act for Erecting an [sic] High Court of Errors and Appeals (1780)

Royal arms of the Privy Council

Thomas McKean

Until the Declaration of Independence in 1776, the ultimate tribunal for the American colonies was the Privy Council in London. Then as now, a committee of the Privy Council heard cases from certain overseas jurisdictions under the rule of the British crown. One legal effect of American Independence, however, was permanently ending the flow of cases to London from the newly-independent United States. A judicial void was left by the disappearance of the Privy Council as the final tribunal for the Commonwealth.

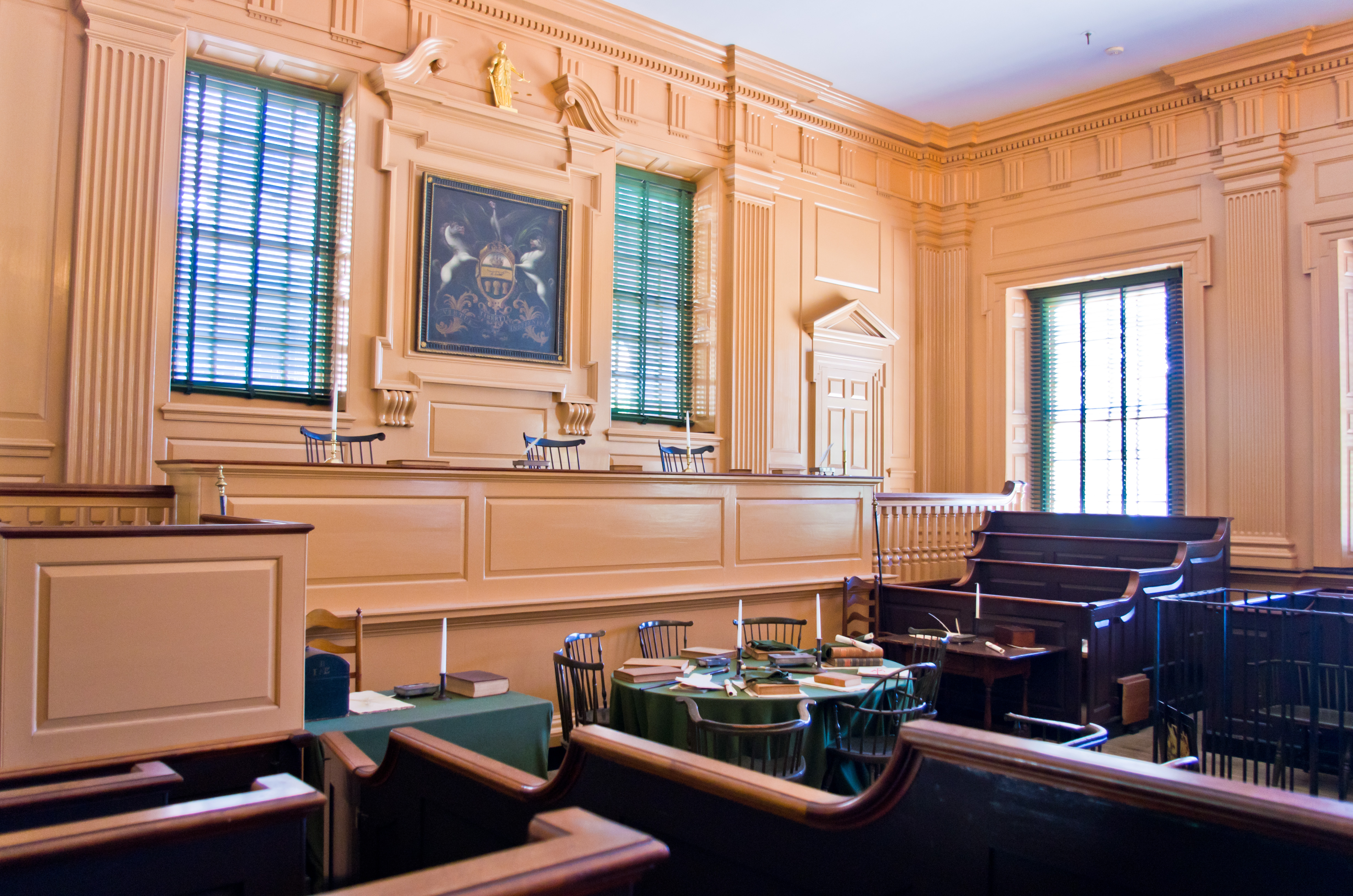
Courtroom of the High Court in Independence Hall, Philadelphia

An Act in 1780 established the High Court of Errors and Appeals. The High Court's jurisdiction encompassed cases brought up from Pennsylvania's supreme court, register's courts, and state admiralty court. The establishing statute recited, "the good people of this commonwealth, by their happy deliverance from their late dependent condition [on Britain], and by becoming free and sovereign are released from this badge of slavery and have acquired the transcendent benefit of having justice administered to them at home and at moderate cost and charges." The 1780 Act permitted parties whose cases to the Privy Council had not been adjudicated by July 4, 1776−the date of American Independence−to refile their cases in the new High Court.

=== Name of the court ===
The High Court was called a court of "Errors and Appeals", and not a court "of Appeals" because in the English judicial process there was a difference between a proceeding in error and an appeal. "A writ of error ordered judges to send the record of their proceedings in a particular case to a superior court for inspection. ... The court of error could concern itself only with 'manifest error' revealed by the written words (as where an essential procedural step was missing), or with new facts[.]" The other party in the case would hear the alleged errors and could dispute them. After argument by the attorneys for each party, the court of errors could affirm or reverse the judgment of the lower court. In contrast, an appeal allowed a higher court to look "behind the record" of the written words and determine, for example, if the lower court had made a mistake in law in the case.

=== Courtrooms ===
Despite the difficulties of travel for almost 300 miles and across the Allegheny Mountains from the western part of Pennsylvania, the 1780 Act directed that the High Court was to sit only in Philadelphia, in the far southeastern corner of the Commonwealth. In Philadelphia the High Court met in the Pennsylvania State House (now Independence Hall), in the courtroom usually used by the state supreme court, directly across the vestibule from the Assembly Room in which both the Declaration of Independence and United States Constitution were debated and signed. In 1804, however, the High Court's sessions moved to the Philadelphia County Courthouse (now called Congress Hall), where it met until the court's dissolution in 1808.

== Judges ==
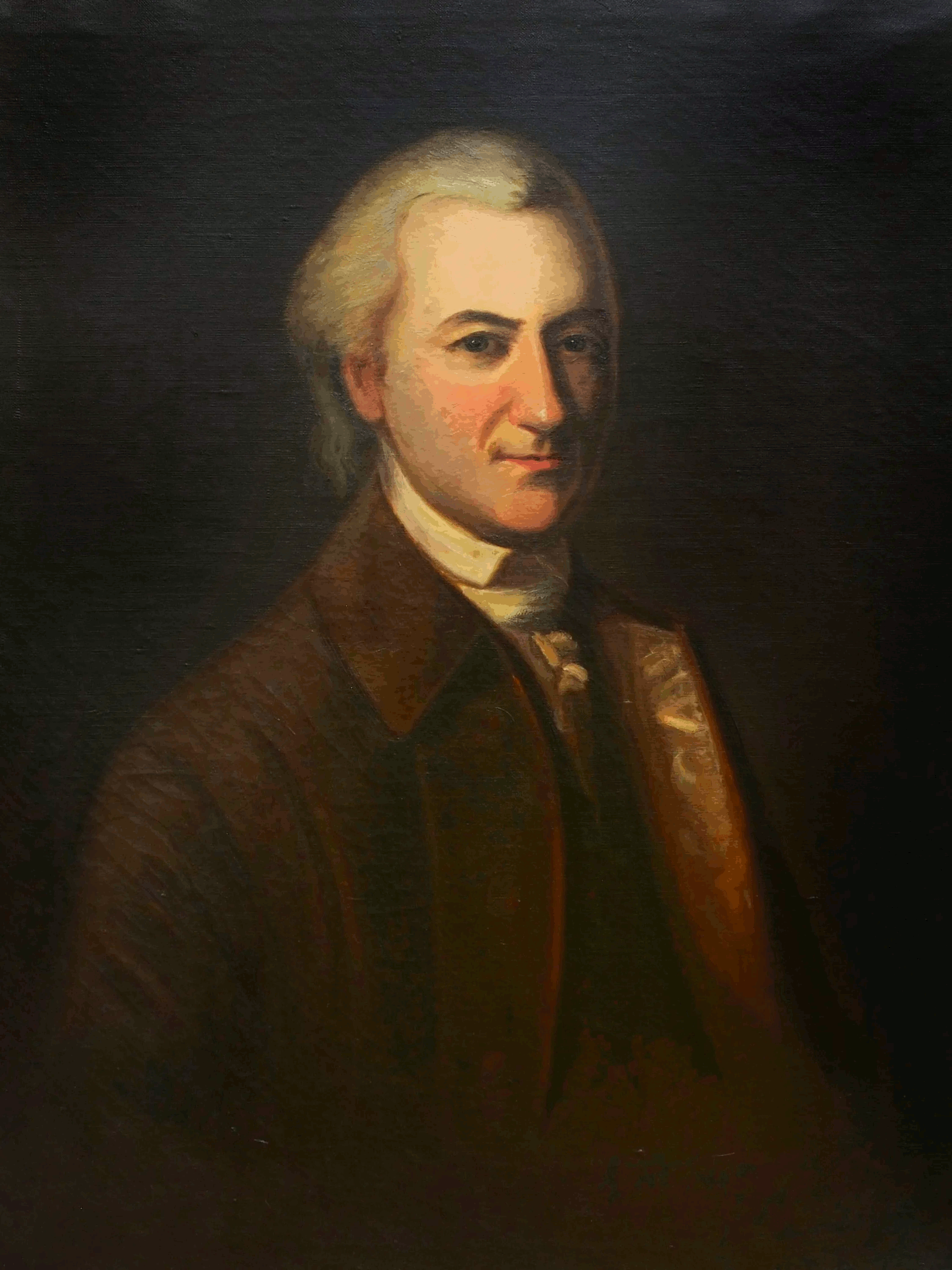
John Dickinson

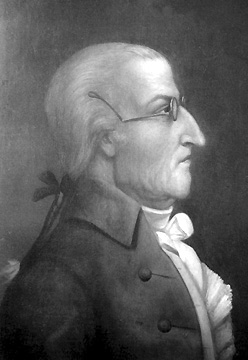
Benjamin Chew

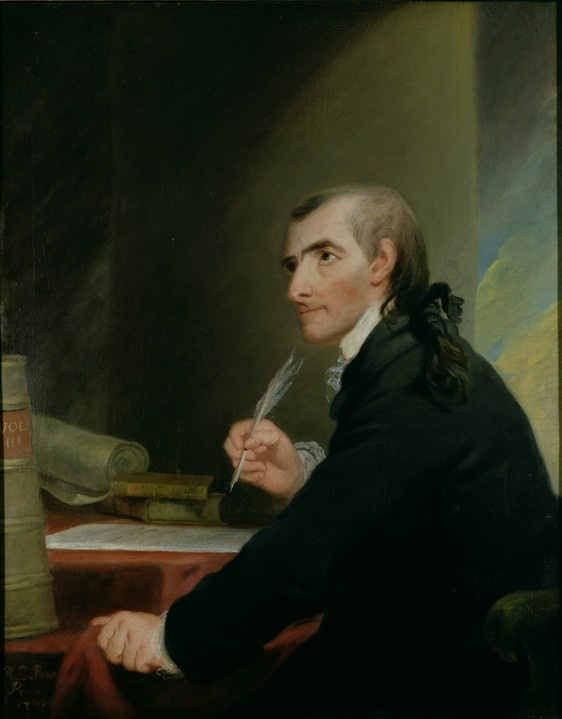
Francis Hopkinson

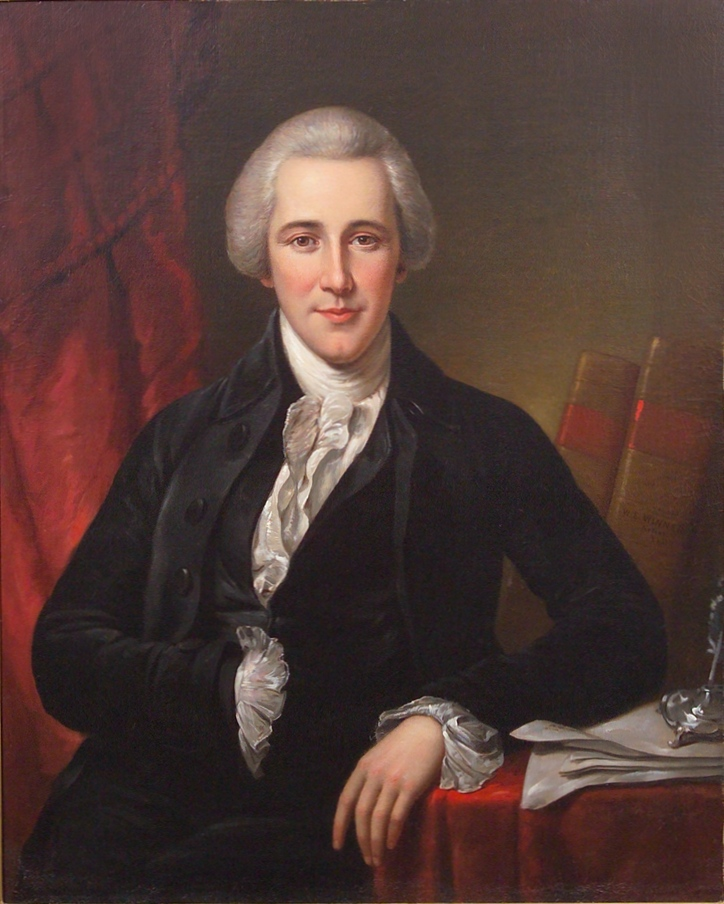
Judge William Bradford, Jr.

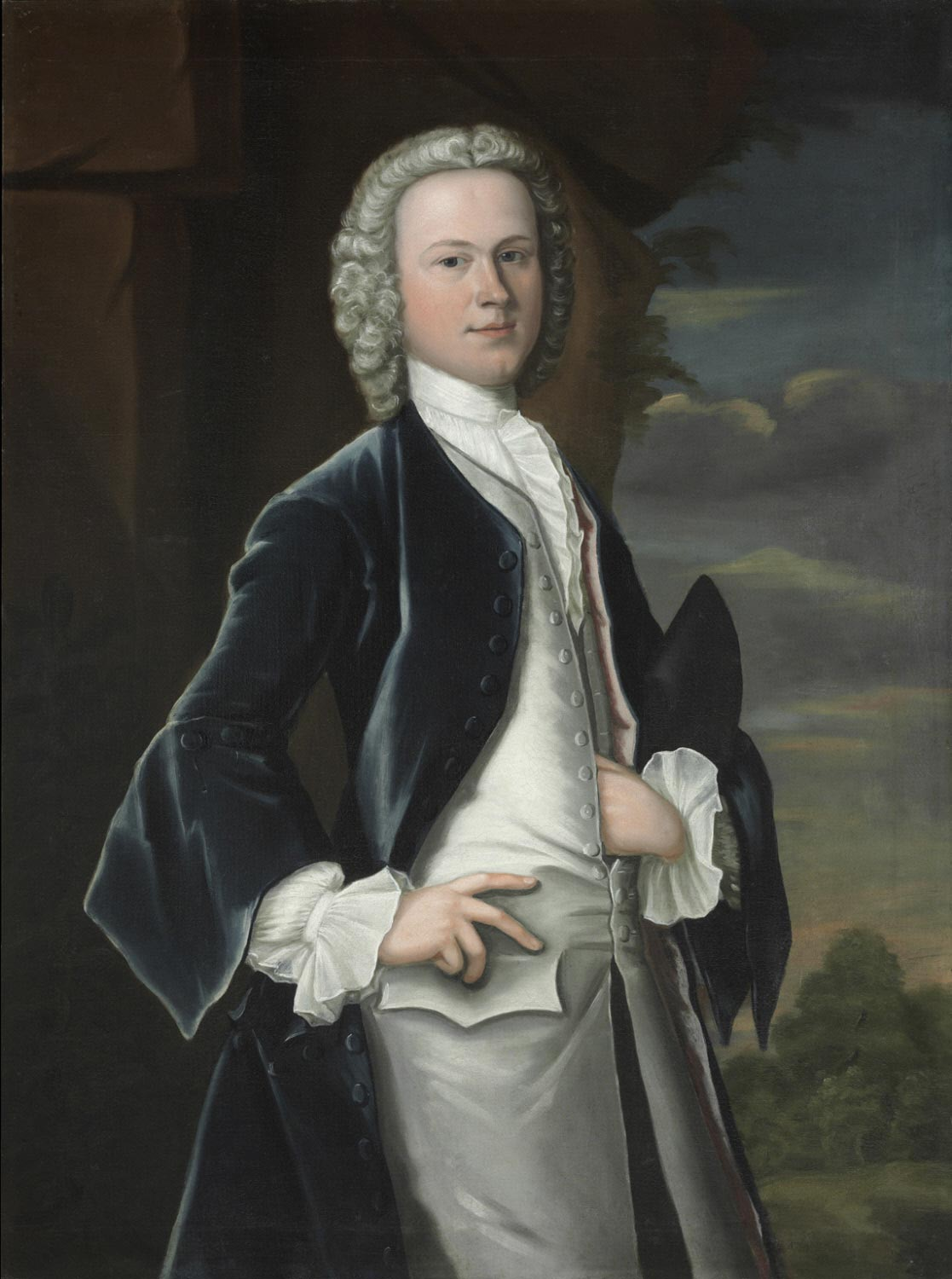
Edward Shippen IV

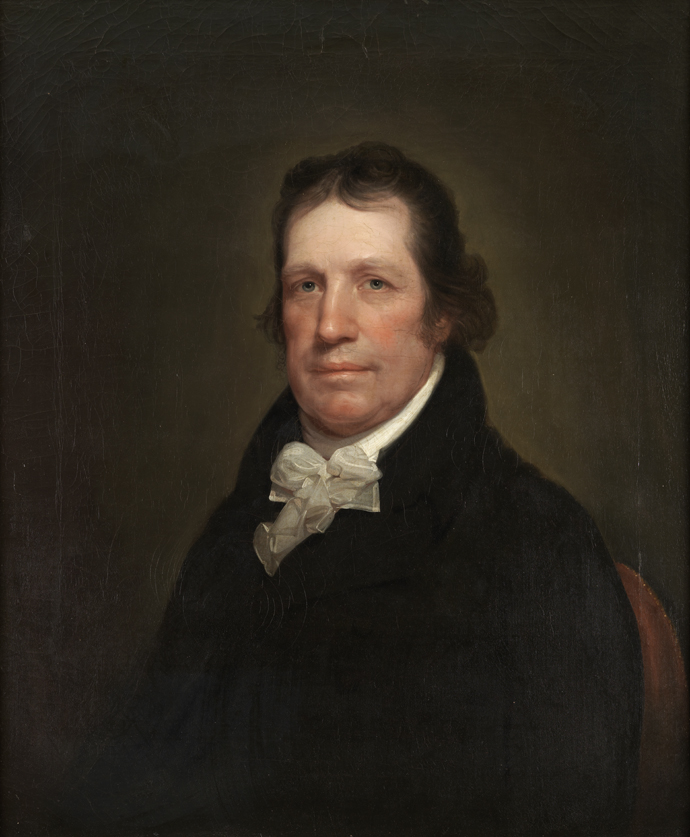
William Tilghman

When first set up, the judges of the High Court comprised the president of the Supreme Executive Council, the judges of the supreme court, the judge of the Pennsylvania admiralty court, and "three persons of known integrity and ability". Until its 1791 reorganization, the High Court's members included both non-lawyers such as Benjamin Franklin, and noted lawyers as Joseph Reed, and John Dickinson. Some of the existing judges were reappointed after the General Assembly reorganized the High Court in 1791.

=== Judges of the High Court of Errors and Appeals, 1780–1808 ===
| Judge | Began term(s) of office |
|---|---|
| Benjamin Franklin | 1785 |
| John Dickinson | 1782 |
| Joseph Reed | 1780 |
| William Moore | 1781 |
| Thomas Mifflin | 1788 |
| Thomas McKean | 1780, 1791 |
| Edward Shippen IV | 1784, 1791 |
| William Tilghman | 1805 |
| James Riddle | 1794 |
| Benjamin Chew | 1791 |
| Jasper Yeates | 1791 |
| Thomas Smith | 1794 |
| James Biddle | 1791 |
| William Augustus Atlee | 1780, 1791 |
| John Evans | 1780 |
| George Bryan | 1780 |
| William Bradford Jr. | 1791 |
| Hugh Henry Brackenridge | 1799 |
| Jacob Rush | 1784, 1791 |
| Thomas Cooper | 1804 |
| Samuel Miles | 1783 |
| Henry Wynkoop | 1790 |
| James Smith | 1780 |
| Francis Hopkinson | 1780 |
| James Bayard | 1783 |
| Alexander Addison | 1791 |
| John D. Coxe | 1797 |
| John Joseph Henry | 1793 |

== Reorganization and abolition ==
After Pennsylvania's Constitution of 1790 became effective, the Supreme Executive Council was replaced by a single Governor of Pennsylvania, and the judicial, legislative, and executive powers were separated for the first time in the Commonwealth. The General Assembly necessarily needed to change the composition of the High Court to comply with the new constitution's prescribed separation of powers. Under a 1791 Act, the High Court's bench was redefined as comprising the judges of the supreme court, the presidents of the various courts of common pleas throughout the Commonwealth, and three other persons of known legal ability. In addition, since the federal courts had taken on exclusive admiralty jurisdiction after the United States Constitution came into force in 1789, there was no more Pennsylvania Admiralty Court, and so no state admiralty cases for the High Court to hear, and no admiralty judge to sit on the High Court's bench.

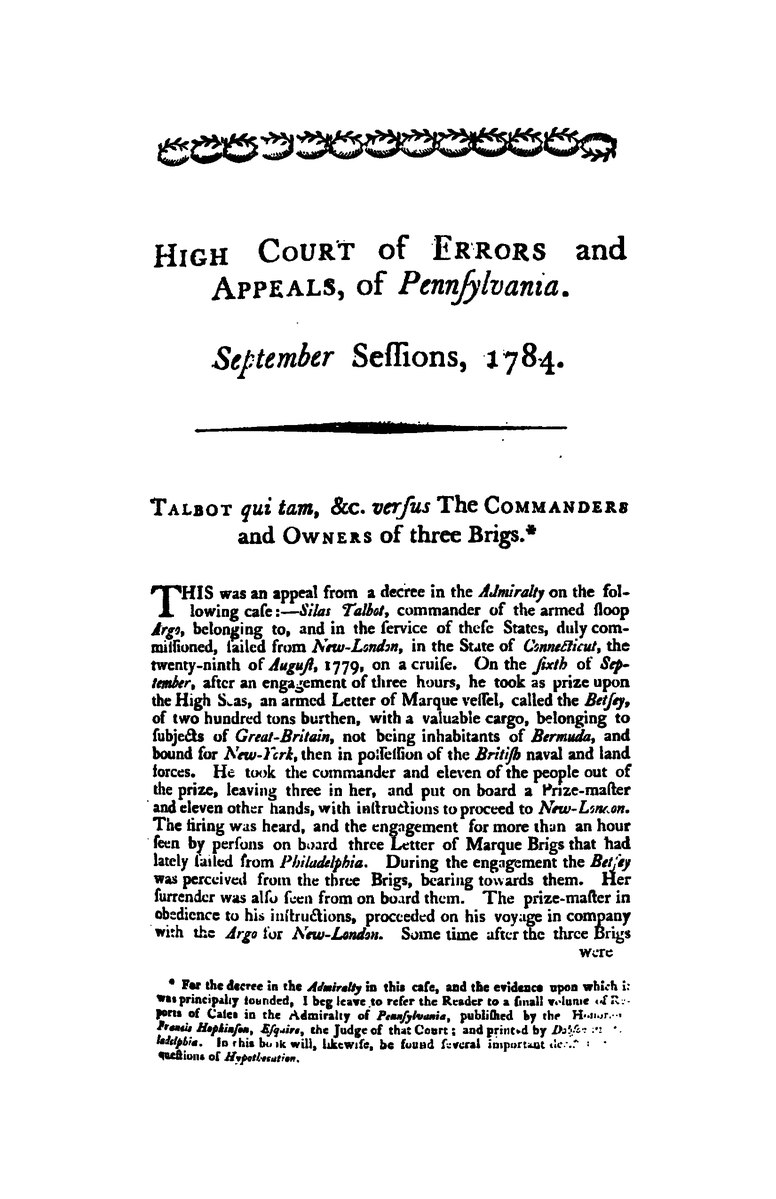
Dallas's report of Talbot v. Commanders of Three Brigs, a 1784 decision of the High Court

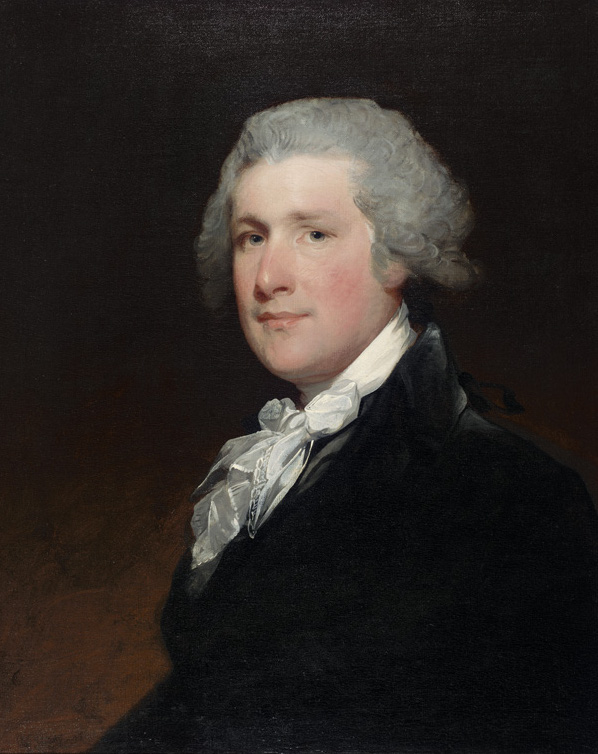
Alexander Dallas

By 1806 the General Assembly determined there was no further need for a judicial layer above the state supreme court (in its entire existence only thirty-three cases had been argued before the High Court); it abolished the High Court of Errors and Appeals and transferred its jurisdiction over appeals and errors to the state supreme court, to be effective in 1808 so that the High Court would have two additional terms to dispose of pending cases before dissolving. The terminal hearing of the High Court was on July 10, 1808.

== Case reports ==
Not all cases in the High Court resulted in an opinion and not all of its opinions have been published.

=== United States Reports ===
Alexander Dallas, a lawyer in Philadelphia who later served as U.S. Secretary of the Treasury, began publishing a series of case reports in what became the United States Reports. The decisions appearing in the early United States Reports are not decisions only of the United States Supreme Court as they were in subsequent volumes. Instead, they include decisions from various Pennsylvania courts. Dallas published a total of four volumes of decisions, and selected cases of the Pennsylvania High Court of Errors and Appeals appear in the first, second, and fourth of Dallas's volumes.

=== Other reporters ===
Other cases from the High Court (some only mentioned in short notes) are scattered throughout Pennsylvania case compilations by Alexander Addison (Addison's Reports (Add.)), Jasper Yeates (Yeates's Reports (Yeates)), Horace Binney (Binney's Reports (Binn.)), and Peter A. Browne (Browne's Reports).

=== Partial list of cases in the High Court of Errors and Appeals, 1780–1808 ===
| Case | Citation | Comments | Link to Opinion or Volume |
|---|---|---|---|
| Montgomery v. Henry | 1 U.S. (1 Dall.) 49 (Pa. Ct. Err. & App. 1780) | full opinion | |
| Talbot v. Commanders of Three Brigs | 1 U.S. (1 Dall.) 95 (Pa. Ct. Err. & App. 1784) | full opinion | |
| Lawson v. Morrison | 2 U.S. (2 Dall.) 286 (Pa. Ct. Err. & App. 1792) | full opinion | |
| Hannum v. Spear | 2 U.S. (2 Dall.) 291 (Pa. Ct. Err. & App. 1795) | full opinion | |
| Ludlow v. Bingham | 4 U.S. (4 Dall.) 41 (Pa. Ct. Err. & App. 1799) | full opinion | |
| Burd v. Smith | 4 U.S. (4 Dall.) 66 (Pa. Ct. Err. & App. 1802) | full opinion | |
| Lea v. Yard | 4 U.S. (4 Dall.) 82 (Pa. Ct. Err. & App. 1804) | full opinion | |
| Purviance v. Angus | 1 U.S. (1 Dall.) 180 (Pa. Ct. Err. & App. 1786) | full opinion | |
| Lewis v. Maris | 1 U.S. (1 Dall.) 278 (Pa. Ct. Err. & App. 1788) | full opinion | |
| Kirkbridge v. Durden | 1 U.S. (1 Dall.) 288 (Pa. Ct. Err. & App. 1788) | full opinion | |
| Lacaze v. Pennsylvania ex rel. Lanoix | 1 Add. 59 (Pa. Ct. Err. & App. 1793) | full opinion | |
| M'Pherson v. M'Pherson | 1 Add. 327 (Pa. Ct. Err. & App. 1797) | full opinion | |
| Skinner v. Robison | 1 Browne 358 (Pa. Ct. Err. & App. 1804) | note only | |
| Palmer v. Sparkes | 4 Yeates 385 (Pa. Ct. Err. & App. 1801) | note only | |
| Hill v. West | 4 Yeates 385 (Pa. Ct. Err. & App. 1807) | case report on remand to supreme court | |
| Stiles v. Girard | 4 Yeates 1 (Pa. Ct. Err. & App. 17??) | note only | |
| Vasse v. Ball | 2 Yeates 185 (Pa. Ct. Err. & App. 1797) | note only | |
| Johnson v. Haine's Lessee | 4 U.S. (4 Dall.) 55 (Pa. Ct. Err. & App. 1799) | full opinion | |
| Spear v. Hannum | 1 Yeates 388 (Pa. Ct. Err. & App. 1795) | note only | |
| Furry v. Stone | 1 Yeates 187 (Pa. Ct. Err. & App. 1792) | note only | |
| Fitzgerald v. Caldwell | 2 U.S. (2 Dall.) 215 (Pa. Ct. Err. & App. 1793) | full opinion at end of supreme court's opinion | |
| Hill's Lessee v. West | 1 Binn. 488 (Pa. Ct. Err. & App. 1808) | note only | |
| Dempsey v. Insurance Co. | 1 Binn. 299 (Pa. Ct. Err. & App. 1808) | note only | |
| Hassanclever v. Tucker | 2 Binn. 525 (Pa. Ct. Err. & App. 1803) | full opinion | |
| Hauer's Lessee v. Sheetz | 2 Binn. 532 (Pa. Ct. Err. & App. 1807) | full opinion | |
| Insurance Co. v. Jones | 2 Binn. 547 (Pa. Ct. Err. & App. 1807) | full opinion | |
| Ewing v. Houston | 4 U.S. (4 Dall.) 58 (Pa. Ct. Err. & App. 1799) | full opinion | |
| Livezey v. Gorgas | 4 U.S. (4 Dall.) 61 (Pa. Ct. Err. & App. 1799) | full opinion | |

== Records ==
Records of the High Court are held at the Pennsylvania State Archives in the capital city, Harrisburg. These records are:

=== Minutes and writs of the High Court of Errors and Appeals ===
A record of the proceedings of the High Court of Errors and Appeals between April 6, 1780 and July 2, 1808. Data includes date of session, names of plaintiff (appellant), defendant (appellee), their attorneys, court members present; listings of writs of error and docketed cases, the courts or counties from which the appeal was made, and a listing of cases argued, adjudged and subsequent orders by the court. (Series #33.128)

=== Mittimus papers ===
Mittimus papers covering the years 1783–1785, 1788, 1792–1793, 1795, 1798–1799, 1801, and 1804. These include writs affirming the judgments of the Supreme Court as decided by the High Court of Errors and Appeals, and remitting the case back to the Supreme Court for execution of judgment. Information has names of appellant and appellee; nature of the case; High Court of Errors and Appeals judgment; date writ was returned to the Supreme Court. (Series #33.129)

== See also ==
- List of Privy Counsellors (1714–1820)
- Courts of Pennsylvania
- List of justices of the Supreme Court of Pennsylvania
