= Bas v. Tingy =

- Supreme Court of the United States

Argued August 14, 1800 Decided August 15, 1800
- Full case name: Bas, Plaintiff in Error v. Tingy, Defendant in Error
- Citations: 4 U.S. 37 (more) 4 Dall. 37; 1 L. Ed. 731; 1800 U.S. LEXIS 307

Court membership
- Chief Justice Oliver Ellsworth Associate Justices William Cushing · William Paterson; Samuel Chase · Bushrod Washington; Alfred Moore

Case opinions
- Seriatim: Moore
- Seriatim: Washington
- Seriatim: Chase
- Seriatim: Paterson

Bas v. Tingy, 4 U.S. (4 Dall.) 37 (1800) was a case in maritime law, argued before the United States Supreme Court in 1800. The parties were John Bas, owner of the private vessel Eliza which was captured by French privateers at sea, and Tingy, commander of a public armed vessel—the Ganges—which recovered the Eliza.

The case hinged on a matter of the law of salvage, or marine salvage; two separate laws prescribed different rates of compensation for salvors, or rescuers of abandoned or captured ships. A 1798 law stated that the owner of a ship which is recovered by a "public" vessel shall pay one-eighth of the ship's value to the salvors, as recovery fee. A 1799 law had more complex language: if a captured ship is recovered within 24 hours, the owner shall pay the salvors one-eighth its value; if a captured ship is recovered 96 hours after its capture, the owner shall pay the salvor one-half the ship's value. Tingy, the salvor, sought the greater compensation of one-half, while Bas, the owner, sought the lesser payment of one-eighth. The Supreme Court affirmed the lower courts' decision, validating the later 1799 law's language: Bas would have to pay the higher rate of one-half as recovery fee.

Bas v. Tingy occurred in the political context of the Quasi-War, maritime skirmishes between the United States and France. The case is also notable as having the only recorded opinion of associate justice Alfred Moore.

== Background ==
Relations were deteriorating with France and Congress began enacting laws providing armed American ships greater ability to reclaim American ships taken by the French. In 1798, Congress passed legislation allowing for payment of 1/8 full value of the vessel, to be paid to the recaptor, for ships reclaimed from the French. However, in 1799, Congress enacted another law allowing the recaptors of a private vessel 1/2 salvage value of the ship, where retaken after 96 hours from the enemy. This was to be paid by the vessel's owner and without any deduction.

On April 21, 1799, Tingy, captain of the Ganges recaptured the Eliza, belonging to Bas, after the French had taken it three weeks before. Bas attempted to pay Tingy 1/8 value, pursuant to the 1798 law, while Tingy demanded 1/2 payment, in accordance with the 1799 law. After lower courts ruled that Tingy was entitled to 1/2 value, the case was appealed to the United States Supreme Court.

== Opinion of the Court ==
Justice Bushrod Washington, writing first for the Court, noted that the difference between the two laws was that the 1798 dealt with ships recaptured from the French, while the 1799 law dealt with ships recaptured from the enemy. This turned on the issue of "was France the enemy?" and the larger question of, "were we at war?" Washington proceeded to recognize the difference between a perfect war, where Congress declares war upon another country, and an imperfect war, where Congress does not declare but rather authorizes hostilities. Congress had, in this case, raised an army, suspended commerce with France and dissolved a treaty. This also allowed them to defend themselves against French ships and reclaim American ships as prize. This was, by all accounts, an imperfect war, qualifying France as an enemy under the 1799 law.

Justice Samuel Chase took a separate approach to the same conclusion, noting that in a perfect war "...operations are restricted and regulated by the jus belli, forming a part of the law of nations," but in an imperfect war "its extent and operation depend on our municipal laws." With Congress authorizing hostilities, this was an imperfect war against France, making them the enemy and validating the 1799 law.

Justice William Paterson deemphasized the nature of the war, perfect versus imperfect, noting only that we were at war "so far as we may proceed in hostile operations." For the duration of this war, France was the enemy, and the 1799 law applied.

== Subsequent developments ==
The decision of the lower courts was affirmed. The 1799 act of Congress governed the dispute and Captain Tingy was awarded 1/2 the value of the Eliza.
