= Turner v. Bank of North America =

- Supreme Court of the United States
- Full case name: Turner v. Bank of North America
- Citations: 4 U.S. 8 (more) 4 Dall. 8; 1 L. Ed. 718

Holding
- "[t]he 11th section of the Judiciary Act, (1 U. S. Stats. at Large, 78.) makes it necessary to state on the record the citizenship of the payee of a negotiable note sued on by an indorsee."

Turner v. Bank of North America, 4 U.S. (4 Dall.) 8 (1799), was a 1799 decision of the United States Supreme Court asserting that "[t]he 11th section of the Judiciary Act, (1 U. S. Stats. at Large, 78.) makes it necessary to state on the record the citizenship of the payee of a negotiable note sued on by an indorsee."

== See also ==
- Bank of North America
