= Motion to quash =

Request to invalidate a court decision or proceeding

A motion to quash is a request to a court or other tribunal to render a previous decision or proceeding null or invalid. The exact usage of motions to quash depends on the rules of the particular court or tribunal.

In some cases, motions to quash are requests to nullify a decision made by the same or a lower court. It can arise out of mistakes made by any lawyer or court officer. A lawyer may file a motion to quash if a mistake has been made on the part of a court, or if an attorney believes that some court document such as a subpoena was not issued or delivered following the required procedure. For example, a party that receives improper service of process may file a motion to quash.

In the context of a court hearing an appeal, depending on the rules of the court, a motion to quash the appeal may be made on the basis that the court has no jurisdiction.
