= Alfred Moore =

US Supreme Court justice from 1800 to 1804

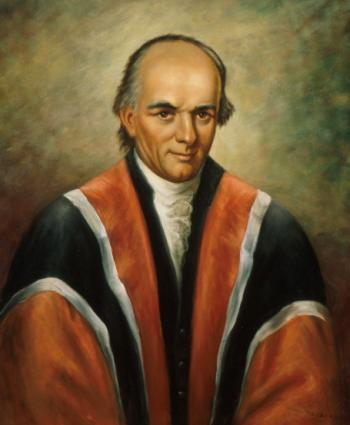

Associate Justice of the Supreme Court of the United States
- In office April 21, 1800 – January 26, 1804
- Nominated by: John Adams
- Preceded by: James Iredell
- Succeeded by: William Johnson

4th Attorney General of North Carolina
- In office April 22, 1782 – January 9, 1791
- Governor: Alexander Martin; Richard Caswell; Samuel Johnston; Alexander Martin
- Preceded by: James Iredell
- Succeeded by: John Haywood

Member of the North Carolina House of Representatives
- In office 1782
- In office 1792

Personal details
- Born: May 21, 1755 New Hanover County, North Carolina, British America
- Died: October 15, 1810 (aged 55) Bladen County, North Carolina, U.S.
- Party: Federalist

Military service
- Allegiance: United Colonies of North America
- Branch/service: Continental Army
- Years of service: 1775–1782
- Rank: Colonel
- Unit: 1st North Carolina Regiment
- Battles/wars: American Revolutionary War: Battle of Moore's Creek Bridge; Siege of Charleston; Battle of Guilford Court House

Alfred Moore (May 21, 1755 – October 15, 1810) was an American judge, lawyer, planter and military officer who became an associate justice of the Supreme Court of the United States. Moore Square, a park located in the Moore Square Historic District in Raleigh, North Carolina, was named in his honor, as was Moore County, North Carolina. He was also a founder and trustee of the University of North Carolina at Chapel Hill.

Moore is noted for having written just one opinion for the Court during his term of service: Bas v. Tingy, a minor case of maritime law. Although a member of the Court for nearly four years, poor health kept Moore from the Court's business during much of his tenure. In particular he did not participate in Marbury v. Madison, a landmark case decided while he was on the Court. Moore was one of the least effective justices in the history of the Court, his career having "made scarcely a ripple in American judicial history."

== Family and education ==
Alfred Moore was born May 21, 1755, in New Hanover County, North Carolina, to Anne (Grange) and Maurice Moore. The Moore family had a long history in the area. His great-grandfather, James Moore, served as governor of Carolina from 1700 to 1703. Alfred Moore's father, Maurice, was a colonial judge in North Carolina and published an essay denouncing the Stamp Act.

Around 1764, following the death of his mother and his father's remarriage, Alfred was sent to Boston to complete his education. Later, he returned to North Carolina and read law as an apprentice to his father and was admitted to the bar in April 1775.

== Military service and political career ==
On September 1, 1775, at the outset of the American Revolutionary War, Moore became a captain in the 1st North Carolina Regiment of the Continental Army, of which his uncle, James Moore, was colonel. He fought in the Battle of Moore's Creek Bridge, and took part in the Siege of Charleston, South Carolina, after British forces attempted to capture Sullivan's Island. On March 8, 1777, following the deaths of his father, brother and uncle, Moore resigned his commission to care for the family plantation. Even so, he continued to be involved in irregular military activities against British and Loyalist forces, becoming a colonel in the North Carolina militia from 1777 to 1782. When Lord Cornwallis moved through southeastern North Carolina after the Battle of Guilford Court House, his troops plundered all Patriot slave plantations in their path. British forces under the command of Major James Craig burnt Moore's slave plantation and "carried off the stock and slaves".

Following the war, Moore was elected to the North Carolina General Assembly, which eventually elected him to serve as Attorney General, a position he held from 1782 to 1791. By 1790, Moore enslaved 48 people on his slave plantation. As Attorney General, in 1787, he argued the State's case in Bayard v. Singleton, 1 N.C. (Mart) 5, a decision of the North Carolina Court of Conference (the precursor of the North Carolina Supreme Court) that became an important early instance of the application of judicial review. Moore, an ardent Federalist favoring a strong national government, took a leading role in securing North Carolina's ratification of the United States Constitution after the state had initially rejected it in 1788. He also played a role in the founding of the University of North Carolina at Chapel Hill. He was among those who selected the site for the university, and he served on its board of trustees from 1789 until 1807.

Moore was again elected to the state House of Representatives in 1792, and served one term. In 1794, he was the Federalist candidate for United States Senate; he lost by one vote to Democratic-Republican Timothy Bloodworth. In 1798, Moore was again the Federalist candidate for U.S. Senate; he lost again, this time to Jesse Franklin. That same year, the General Assembly elected Moore to a seat on the North Carolina Superior Court.

== Supreme Court justice ==
On December 4, 1799, President John Adams nominated Moore as an associate justice of the United States Supreme Court, to succeed James Iredell. He was confirmed by the U.S. Senate on December 10, 1799, and was sworn into office on April 21, 1800.

He served until his resignation on January 26, 1804. Due to poor health, Moore's contribution to the court was abbreviated. In his four years of service, he wrote only one opinion, Bas v. Tingy, upholding a conclusion that France was an enemy in the undeclared Quasi-War of 1798–1799. Moore's scant contribution has led Court observers to place him on lists of the worst justices in the history of the Court.

== Personal life ==
In 1777, he married Susanne Elizabeth Eagles. They had several children, including Alfred, Augusta, and Sara Louisa.

He died October 15, 1810, in Bladen County, North Carolina, and is buried at St. Philip's Church, in Brunswick County.

His summer home, Moorefields, which he built after the Revolutionary War, located in Orange County, North Carolina, near Hillsborough, still stands, and is listed in the National Register of Historic Places.

Legal offices
Preceded by James Iredell	Attorney General of North Carolina; 1782–1791	Succeeded by John Haywood
Preceded by James Iredell	Associate Justice of the Supreme Court of the United States; 1800–1804	Succeeded by William Johnson
