= Non prosequitur =

Non prosequitur (also known as non pros.) is a legal judgment "against the plaintiff for a neglect to take any of those steps which it is incumbent on him to take in due time." A non pros judgment is a final judgment, which is only re-opened with cause shown.
