= United States Reports, volume 1 =

1754 to 1789 records of Pennsylvania courts

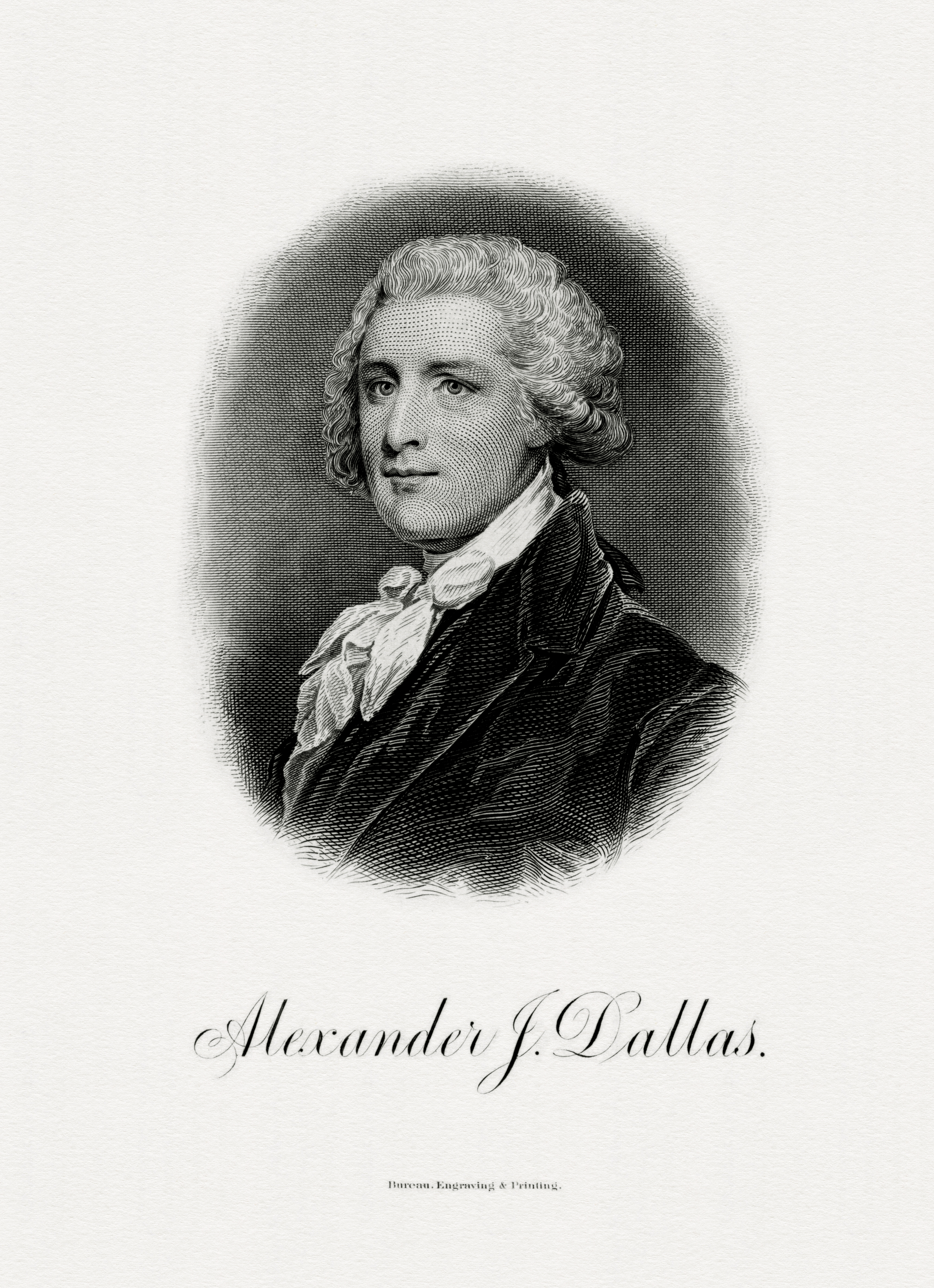
Alexander Dallas as Secretary of the Treasury (1814–1816)

This is a list of all the United States Supreme Court cases from volume 1 of the United States Reports, decided by various Pennsylvania courts from 1754 to 1789.

== Introduction ==
=== Alexander Dallas and Dallas Reports ===
None of the cases reported in 1 U.S. (1 Dall.) are from the Supreme Court of the United States. They are decisions from various appellate and trial courts from the years 1754–1789, before and after the American Revolution, from the colonial Province of Pennsylvania and the post-independence Commonwealth of Pennsylvania.

Alexander J. Dallas, a Philadelphia lawyer and later United States Secretary of the Treasury, had been in the business of reporting local law cases for newspapers and periodicals. When the US Supreme Court sat in Philadelphia from 1791 to 1800, he collected their cases as well, and later began compiling his case reports in a bound volume which he called Reports of cases ruled and adjudged in the courts of Pennsylvania, before and since the Revolution.

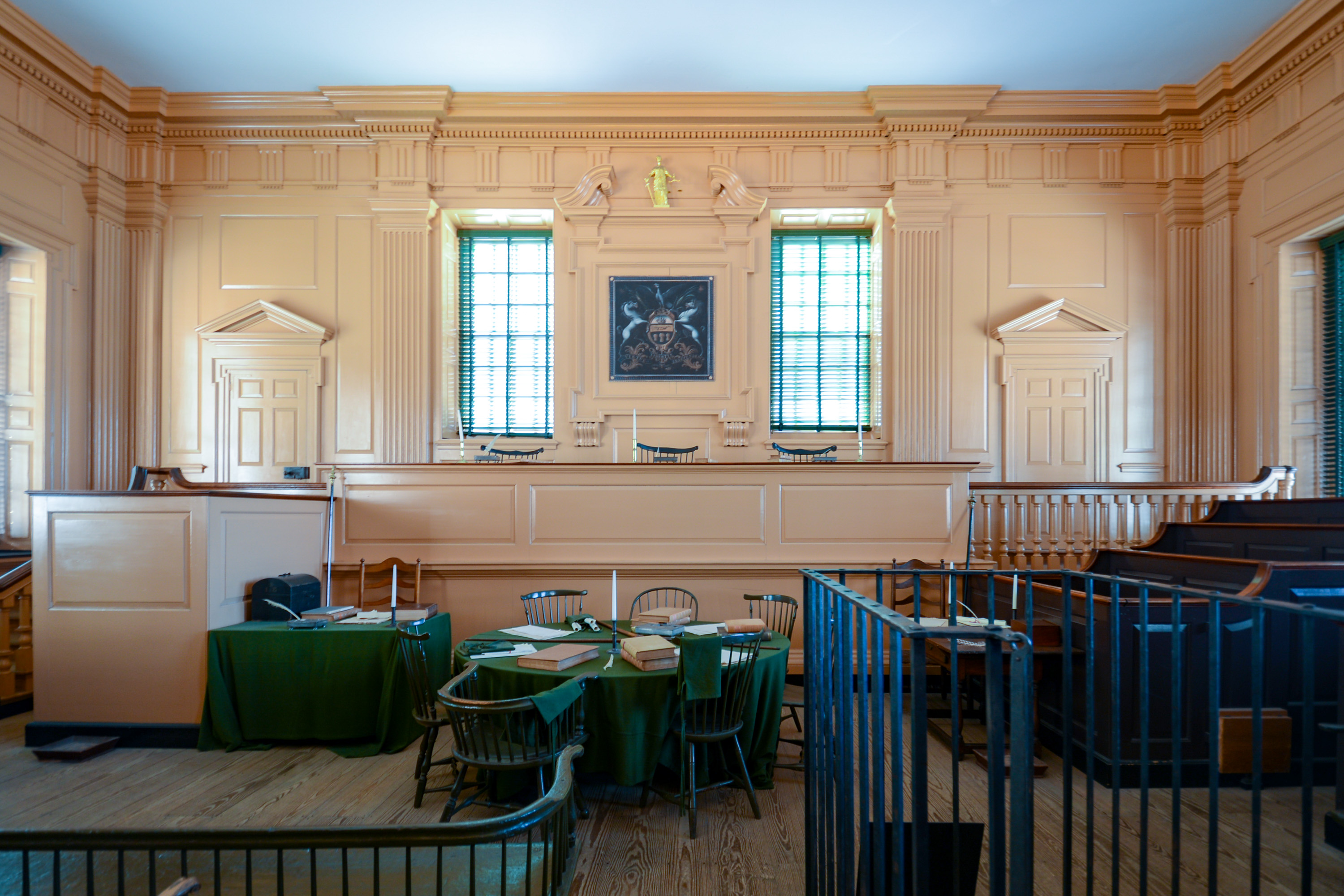
Courtroom of the Pennsylvania High Court of Errors & Appeals, and Supreme Court, Independence Hall, Philadelphia

When the US Supreme Court along with the rest of the new federal government moved in 1791 from the former capital, New York City, to the nation's temporary capital in Philadelphia, Dallas was appointed the Supreme Court's first unofficial and unpaid Supreme Court Reporter. (Court reporters in that age received no salary, but were expected to profit from the publication and sale of their compiled decisions.) Dallas continued to collect and publish Pennsylvania and other decisions, adding federal Supreme Court cases to his reports. Dallas published four volumes of decisions during his tenure as Reporter, known as the Dallas Reports.

=== Nominative Reports ===
In 1874, the U.S. government created the United States Reports, and retroactively numbered older privately-published case reports as part of the new series. As a result, cases appearing in volumes 1–90 of U.S. Reports have dual citation forms; one for the volume number of U.S. Reports, and one for the volume number of the reports named for the relevant reporter of decisions (these are called "nominative reports"). As such, volumes 1–4 of United States Reports correspond to volumes 1–4 of Dallas Reports. The dual citation form of, for example, Kennedy v. Fury is 1 U.S. (1 Dall.) 72 (Pa. 1783).

=== Courts in 1 U.S. (1 Dall.) ===
The cases reported in 1 U.S. (1 Dall.) come from the Pennsylvania High Court of Errors and Appeals (Pa. Ct. Err. & App.) (which from its creation in 1780 to its dissolution in 1808 was the court of last resort in the Pennsylvania judiciary); Supreme Court of Pennsylvania (Pa.); Court of Common Pleas (Pa. Ct. Com. Pl.); Pennsylvania court of Oyer and Terminer (Pa. O. & T.). (To avoid confusion, the Court of Errors and Appeals will be cited as "Pa. Ct. Err. & App." rather than as "Pa.", although the latter abbreviation should be used, according to Bluebook rules, for the highest court in Pennsylvania at a particular time. Rather, "Pa." will consistently be used to indicate the Supreme Court of Pennsylvania.)

== List of cases in 1 U.S. (1 Dall.) ==
Note on Respublica: A number of cases listed below include the title Respublica. Res publica is a Latin form of the term "Commonwealth", meaning in this context the "Commonwealth of Pennsylvania". Pennsylvania is one of four states (along with Massachusetts, Virginia, & Kentucky) to refer to itself as a "Commonwealth". It is interchangeable with "State". In the early 19th Century the English term Commonwealth replaced Respublica in new Pennsylvania case names.

Case	Page & year	Court
Anonymous	1 (Pa. 1754)	Supreme Court of Pennsylvania
Hyam's Lessee v. Edwards	1 (Pa. 1759)	Supreme Court of Pennsylvania
Weston v. Stammers	2 (Pa. 1759)	Supreme Court of Pennsylvania
Stevenson v. Pemberton	3 (Pa. 1760)	Supreme Court of Pennsylvania
Ashton's Lessee v. Ashton	4 (Pa. 1760)	Supreme Court of Pennsylvania
Hewes v. M'Dowell	5 (Pa. 1762)	Supreme Court of Pennsylvania
The King v. Lukens	5 (Pa. 1762)	Supreme Court of Pennsylvania
Bethel v. Lloyd	2 (Pa. 1759)	Supreme Court of Pennsylvania
Nixon v. Long	6 (Pa. 1762)	Supreme Court of Pennsylvania
Fothergill's Lessee v. Stover	6 (Pa. 1763)	Supreme Court of Pennsylvania
Wallace v. Child	7 (Pa. 1763)	Supreme Court of Pennsylvania
Price v. Watkins	8 (Pa. 1763)	Supreme Court of Pennsylvania
Albertson's Lessee v. Robeson	9 (Pa. 1764)	Supreme Court of Pennsylvania
The King v. Haas	9 (Pa. 1764)	Supreme Court of Pennsylvania
The King v. Rapp	9 (Pa. 1764)	Supreme Court of Pennsylvania
Richardson's Lessee v. Campbell	10 (Pa. 1764)	Supreme Court of Pennsylvania
Story v. Strettel	10 (Pa. 1764)	Supreme Court of Pennsylvania
King's Road	11 (Pa. 1764)	Supreme Court of Pennsylvania
Davey v. Turner	11 (Pa. 1764)	Supreme Court of Pennsylvania
Thomas's Lessee v. Horlocker	14 (Pa. 1766)	Supreme Court of Pennsylvania
Strickland's Lessee v. Poole	14 (Pa. 1765)	Supreme Court of Pennsylvania
Boehm v. Engle	15 (Pa. 1767)	Supreme Court of Pennsylvania
Riche v. Broadfield	16 (Pa. 1768)	Supreme Court of Pennsylvania
Swift v. Hawkins	17 (Pa. 1768)	Supreme Court of Pennsylvania
Lloyd's Lessee v. Taylor	17 (Pa. 1768)	Supreme Court of Pennsylvania
Proprietary's Lessee v. Ralston	18 (Pa. 1773)	Supreme Court of Pennsylvania
Biddle's Lessee v. Shippen	19 (Pa. 1773)	Supreme Court of Pennsylvania
Anonymous	20 (Pa. 1773)	Supreme Court of Pennsylvania
Hurst v. Dippo	20 (Pa. 1774)	Supreme Court of Pennsylvania
Steiner v. Fell	22 (Pa. 1776)	Supreme Court of Pennsylvania
Wheeler v. Hughes	23 (Pa. 1776)	Supreme Court of Pennsylvania
Fallowfield Township v. Marlborough Township	28 (Pa. 1776)	Supreme Court of Pennsylvania
Keppele v. Williams	29 (Pa. 1776)	Supreme Court of Pennsylvania
Respublica v. Malin	33 (Pa. 1778)	Supreme Court of Pennsylvania
Respublica v. Carlisle	35 (Pa. O. & T. 1778)	Pennsylvania Court of Oyer and Terminer
Respublica v. Roberts	39 (Pa. O. & T. 1778)	Pennsylvania Court of Oyer and Terminer
Respublica v. Sweers	41 (Pa. 1779)	Supreme Court of Pennsylvania
James's Claim	47 (Pa. 1780)	Supreme Court of Pennsylvania
Respublica v. Powell	47 (Pa. 1780)	Supreme Court of Pennsylvania
Montgomery v. Henry	49 (Pa. Ct. Err. & App. 1780)	Pennsylvania High Court of Errors and Appeals
Jacobs v. Adams	52 (Pa. 1781)	Supreme Court of Pennsylvania
Respublica v. Chapman	53 (Pa. 1781)	Supreme Court of Pennsylvania
Respublica v. Buffington	60 (Pa. 1781)	Supreme Court of Pennsylvania
McVeaugh v. Goods	62 (Pa. 1781)	Supreme Court of Pennsylvania
McDill's Lessee v. McDill	63 (Pa. 1782)	Supreme Court of Pennsylvania
Rapp v. Le Blanc	63 (Pa. 1781)	Supreme Court of Pennsylvania
Morris's Lessee v. Vanderen	64 (Pa. 1782)	Supreme Court of Pennsylvania
Shrider's Lessee v. Morgan	68 (Pa. 1782)	Supreme Court of Pennsylvania
Respublica v. Shryber	68 (Pa. 1782)	Supreme Court of Pennsylvania
Wilcox v. Henry	69 (Pa. 1782)	Supreme Court of Pennsylvania
Kennedy v. Fury	72 (Pa. 1783)	Supreme Court of Pennsylvania
Respublica v. Mesca	73 (Pa. O. & T. 1783)	Pennsylvania Court of Oyer and Terminer
Nathan v. Virginia	77 (Pa. Ct. Com. Pl. 1781)	Pennsylvania Court of Common Pleas
McCarty v. Nixon	77 (Pa. Ct. Com. Pl. 1784)	Pennsylvania Court of Common Pleas
Carlisle v. Cunningham	81 (Pa. Ct. Com. Pl. 1784)	Pennsylvania Court of Common Pleas
Hunter's Lessee v. Kennedy	81 (Pa. Ct. Com. Pl. 1784)	Pennsylvania Court of Common Pleas
Rivers v. Walker	81 (Pa. Ct. Com. Pl. 1784)	Pennsylvania Court of Common Pleas
Leib v. Bolton	82 (Pa. Ct. Com. Pl. 1784)	Pennsylvania Court of Common Pleas
Snowden v. Hemming	83 (Pa. Ct. Com. Pl. 1784)	Pennsylvania Court of Common Pleas
Hagner v. Musgrove	83 (Pa. Ct. Com. Pl. 1784)	Pennsylvania Court of Common Pleas
Rodman v. Hoops's Executor	85 (Pa. 1784)	Supreme Court of Pennsylvania
Respublica v. Doan	86 (Pa. 1784)	Supreme Court of Pennsylvania
Hamilton's Lessee v. Galloway	93 (Pa. 1784)	Supreme Court of Pennsylvania
Hight v. Wilson	94 (Pa. 1784)	Supreme Court of Pennsylvania
Burke's Lessee v. Ryan	94 (Pa. 1784)	Supreme Court of Pennsylvania
Talbot v. Commanders of Three Brigs	95 (Pa. Ct. Err. & App. 1784)	Pennsylvania High Court of Errors and Appeals
Respublica v. Keating	110 (Pa. O. & T. 1784)	Pennsylvania Court of Oyer and Terminer
Respublica v. de Longchamps	111 (Pa. O. & T. 1784)	Pennsylvania Court of Oyer and Terminer
Gerard v. Basse	119 (Pa. Ct. Com. Pl. 1784)	Pennsylvania Court of Common Pleas
Young v. Reuben	119 (Pa. Ct. Com. Pl. 1784)	Pennsylvania Court of Common Pleas
Davison's Lessee v. Bloomer	123 (Pa. 1785)	Supreme Court of Pennsylvania
Tracy v. Wikoff	124 (Pa. 1785)	Supreme Court of Pennsylvania
Wharton v. Morris	125 (Pa. 1785)	Supreme Court of Pennsylvania
Wilson's Lessee v. Campbell	126 (Pa. 1785)	Supreme Court of Pennsylvania
Shoemaker v. Shirtliffe I	127 (Pa. Ct. Com. Pl. 1785)	Pennsylvania Court of Common Pleas
Buckley v. Durant	129 (Pa. Ct. Com. Pl. 1785)	Pennsylvania Court of Common Pleas
Scottin v. Stanley	129 (Pa. Ct. Com. Pl. 1785)	Pennsylvania Court of Common Pleas
Carrew v. Willing	130 (Pa. Ct. Com. Pl. 1785)	Pennsylvania Court of Common Pleas
Campbell v. Richardson	131 (Pa. Ct. Com. Pl. 1785)	Pennsylvania Court of Common Pleas
Shoemaker v. Shirtliffe II	133 (Pa. Ct. Com. Pl. 1785)	Pennsylvania Court of Common Pleas
Burrows v. Heysham	133 (Pa. Ct. Com. Pl. 1785)	Pennsylvania Court of Common Pleas
Jackson v. Keely	135 (Pa. 1785)	Supreme Court of Pennsylvania
Geyger v. Stoy	135 (Pa. 1785)	Supreme Court of Pennsylvania
Graham's Appeal	136 (Pa. 1785)	Supreme Court of Pennsylvania
Vanhorn's Lessee v. Harrison	137 (Pa. 1785)	Supreme Court of Pennsylvania
McCullum v. Coxe	139 (Pa. 1785)	Supreme Court of Pennsylvania
Morris v. De Mars	140 (Pa. 1785)	Supreme Court of Pennsylvania
Woods v. Courter	141 (Pa. Ct. Com. Pl. 1785)	Pennsylvania Court of Common Pleas
Dorrow v. Kelly	142 (Pa. Ct. Com. Pl. 1785)	Pennsylvania Court of Common Pleas
Mifflin v. Gasqui	142 (Pa. Ct. Com. Pl. 1785)	Pennsylvania Court of Common Pleas
Brown v. Scott	145 (Pa. Ct. Com. Pl. 1785)	Pennsylvania Court of Common Pleas
Morris v. Tarin	147 (Pa. Ct. Com. Pl. 1785)	Pennsylvania Court of Common Pleas
Henderson v. Allen	149 (Pa. Ct. Com. Pl. 1785)	Pennsylvania Court of Common Pleas
Respublica v. Caldwell	150 (Pa. O. & T. 1785)	Pennsylvania Court of Oyer and Terminer
Hollingsworth v. Hamelin	151 (Pa. Ct. Com. Pl. 1785)	Pennsylvania Court of Common Pleas
Barnet's Case	152 (Pa. Ct. Com. Pl. 1785)	Pennsylvania Court of Common Pleas
Case v. Hufty	154 (Pa. Ct. Com. Pl. 1785)	Pennsylvania Court of Common Pleas
Vienne v. McCarty	154 (Pa. Ct. Com. Pl. 1785)	Pennsylvania Court of Common Pleas
Weaver v. Lawrence	156 (Pa. Ct. Com. Pl. 1785)	Pennsylvania Court of Common Pleas
Taylor v. Knox	158 (Pa. Ct. Com. Pl. 1785)	Pennsylvania Court of Common Pleas
Hollingsworth v. Leiper	161 (Pa. Ct. Com. Pl. 1786)	Pennsylvania Court of Common Pleas
Ogden v. Ash	162 (Pa. Ct. Com. Pl. 1786)	Pennsylvania Court of Common Pleas
Marriot v. Davey	164 (Pa. Ct. Com. Pl. 1786)	Pennsylvania Court of Common Pleas
Somers v. Balabrega	164 (Pa. Ct. Com. Pl. 1786)	Pennsylvania Court of Common Pleas
Stotesbury v. Covenhoven	164 (Pa. Ct. Com. Pl. 1786)	Pennsylvania Court of Common Pleas
Sliver v. Shelback	165 (Pa. 1786)	Supreme Court of Pennsylvania
Pirate v. Dalby	167 (Pa. 1786)	Supreme Court of Pennsylvania
Kunckel v. Baker	169 (Pa. 1786)	Supreme Court of Pennsylvania
Moore's Lessee v. Few	170 (Pa. 1786)	Supreme Court of Pennsylvania
Dutilh v. Ritchie	171 (Pa. Ct. Com. Pl. 1786)	Pennsylvania Court of Common Pleas
Shotwell v. Boehm	172 (Pa. Ct. Com. Pl. 1786)	Pennsylvania Court of Common Pleas
Grier v. Grier	173 (Pa. 1786)	Supreme Court of Pennsylvania
Kerlin's Lessee v. Bull	175 (Pa. 1786)	Supreme Court of Pennsylvania
Lee v. Biddis	175 (Pa. 1786)	Supreme Court of Pennsylvania
Purviance v. Angus	180 (Pa. Ct. Err. & App. 1786)	Pennsylvania High Court of Errors and Appeals
Hooton v. Will	187 (Pa. Ct. Com. Pl. 1786)	Pennsylvania Court of Common Pleas
Chaplin v. Kirwan	187 (Pa. Ct. Com. Pl. 1786)	Pennsylvania Court of Common Pleas
Innes v. Miller	188 (Pa. Ct. Com. Pl. 1786)	Pennsylvania Court of Common Pleas
James v. Allen	188 (Pa. Ct. Com. Pl. 1786)	Pennsylvania Court of Common Pleas
Gregory's Lessee v. Setter	193 (Pa. 1787)	Supreme Court of Pennsylvania
Morris v. Foreman	193 (Pa. 1787)	Supreme Court of Pennsylvania
Gerard v. La Coste	194 (Pa. Ct. Com. Pl. 1787)	Pennsylvania Court of Common Pleas
The Ship Anna	197 (Pa. Ct. Com. Pl. 1787)	Pennsylvania Court of Common Pleas
Shoemaker v. Knorr	197 (Pa. Ct. Com. Pl. 1787)	Pennsylvania Court of Common Pleas
January v. Goodman	208 (Pa. Ct. Com. Pl. 1787)	Pennsylvania Court of Common Pleas
Pollard v. Shaaffer	210 (Pa. 1787)	Supreme Court of Pennsylvania
Musgrove v. Gibbs	216 (Pa. 1787)	Supreme Court of Pennsylvania
Doane's Administrators v. Penhallow	218 (Pa. Ct. Com. Pl. 1787)	Pennsylvania Court of Common Pleas
Eastwick v. Hugg	222 (Pa. Ct. Com. Pl. 1787)	Pennsylvania Court of Common Pleas
Kuhn v. Trimer	225 (Pa. Ct. Com. Pl. 1787)	Pennsylvania Court of Common Pleas
Hocker v. Stricker	225 (Pa. Ct. Com. Pl. 1787)	Pennsylvania Court of Common Pleas
Busby v. Busby	226 (Pa. Ct. Com. Pl. 1787)	Pennsylvania Court of Common Pleas
Millar v. Hall	229 (Pa. 1788)	Supreme Court of Pennsylvania
Respublica v. Gordon	233 (Pa. 1788)	Supreme Court of Pennsylvania
Steinmetz v. Currey	234 (Pa. 1788)	Supreme Court of Pennsylvania
Respublica v. Shaffer	236 (Pa. O. & T. 1788)	Pennsylvania Court of Oyer and Terminer
Poultney v. Ross	238 (Pa. Ct. Com. Pl. 1788)	Pennsylvania Court of Common Pleas
Brown v. Sutter	239 (Pa. Ct. Com. Pl. 1788)	Pennsylvania Court of Common Pleas
Newman v. Bradley	240 (Pa. Ct. Com. Pl. 1788)	Pennsylvania Court of Common Pleas
Penman v. Wayne	241 (Pa. Ct. Com. Pl. 1788)	Pennsylvania Court of Common Pleas
Jackson v. Vanhorn	241 (Pa. Ct. Com. Pl. 1788)	Pennsylvania Court of Common Pleas
Cooper v. Coates	248 (Pa. Ct. Com. Pl. 1788)	Pennsylvania Court of Common Pleas
James v. Young	248 (Pa. Ct. Com. Pl. 1788)	Pennsylvania Court of Common Pleas
Wallace v. Fitzsimmons	248 (Pa. Ct. Com. Pl. 1788)	Pennsylvania Court of Common Pleas
Gilpin v. Semple	251 (Pa. Ct. Com. Pl. 1788)	Pennsylvania Court of Common Pleas
Shippen's Lessee v. Bush	251 (Pa. Ct. Com. Pl. 1788)	Pennsylvania Court of Common Pleas
Schlosser v. Lesher	251 (Pa. Ct. Com. Pl. 1788)	Pennsylvania Court of Common Pleas
Robertson v. Vogle	252 (Pa. Ct. Com. Pl. 1788)	Pennsylvania Court of Common Pleas
Holingsworth v. Ogle	257 (Pa. 1788)	Supreme Court of Pennsylvania
Chapman v. Steinmetz	261 (Pa. 1788)	Supreme Court of Pennsylvania
Phelps v. Holker	261 (Pa. 1788)	Supreme Court of Pennsylvania
Walton v. Willis	265 (Pa. 1788)	Supreme Court of Pennsylvania
Henry v. Risk	265 (Pa. 1788)	Supreme Court of Pennsylvania
Williams v. Geheogan	267 (Pa. 1788)	Supreme Court of Pennsylvania
Guthrie v. White	268 (Pa. 1788)	Supreme Court of Pennsylvania
Tillier v. Whitehead	269 (Pa. 1788)	Supreme Court of Pennsylvania
Steinmetz v. Currie	270 (Pa. 1788)	Supreme Court of Pennsylvania
Mifflin v. Bingham	272 (Pa. 1788)	Supreme Court of Pennsylvania
Lewis v. Maris	278 (Pa. Ct. Err. & App. 1788)	Pennsylvania High Court of Errors and Appeals
Kirkbride v. Durden	288 (Pa. Ct. Err. & App. 1788)	Pennsylvania High Court of Errors and Appeals
Tetter v. Rapesnyder	293 (Pa. Ct. Com. Pl. 1788)	Pennsylvania Court of Common Pleas
Morgan v. Eckart	295 (Pa. Ct. Com. Pl. 1788)	Pennsylvania Court of Common Pleas
Bolton v. Martin	296 (Pa. Ct. Com. Pl. 1788)	Pennsylvania Court of Common Pleas
Kunckle v. Wynick	305 (Pa. Ct. Com. Pl. 1788)	Pennsylvania Court of Common Pleas
Cooper v. Coats	308 (Pa. Ct. Com. Pl. 1788)	Pennsylvania Court of Common Pleas
Wells v. Fox	308 (Pa. Ct. Com. Pl. 1788)	Pennsylvania Court of Common Pleas
Keely v. Ord	310 (Pa. Ct. Com. Pl. 1788)	Pennsylvania Court of Common Pleas
Lynch v. Wood	310 (Pa. Ct. Com. Pl. 1788)	Pennsylvania Court of Common Pleas
Hudson v. Howell	310 (Pa. Ct. Com. Pl. 1788)	Pennsylvania Court of Common Pleas
Brown's Appeal	311 (Pa. 1788)	Supreme Court of Pennsylvania
Shewell v. Wycoff	312 (Pa. 1788)	Supreme Court of Pennsylvania
Zane's Executors v. Cowperthwaite	312 (Pa. 1788)	Supreme Court of Pennsylvania
Williams v. Craig	313 (Pa. 1788)	Supreme Court of Pennsylvania
Plowman v. Abrams	316 (Pa. 1788)	Supreme Court of Pennsylvania
Richette v. Stewart	317 (Pa. 1788)	Supreme Court of Pennsylvania
Respublica v. Oswald	319 (Pa. 1788)	Supreme Court of Pennsylvania
Lesher v. Gehr	330 (Pa. 1788)	Supreme Court of Pennsylvania
Respublica v. Teischer	335 (Pa. 1788)	Supreme Court of Pennsylvania
James v. Browne	339 (Pa. 1788)	Supreme Court of Pennsylvania
Butcher v. Coats	340 (Pa. 1788)	Supreme Court of Pennsylvania
Murdoch v. Will	341 (Pa. Ct. Com. Pl. 1788)	Pennsylvania Court of Common Pleas
Ingles v. Bringhurst	341 (Pa. Ct. Com. Pl. 1788)	Pennsylvania Court of Common Pleas
Geyer v. Smith	347 (Pa. Ct. Com. Pl. 1788)	Pennsylvania Court of Common Pleas
McKegg v. Crawford	347 (Pa. Ct. Com. Pl. 1788)	Pennsylvania Court of Common Pleas
Penman v. Wayne	348 (Pa. Ct. Com. Pl. 1788)	Pennsylvania Court of Common Pleas
Barnard v. Field	348 (Pa. Ct. Com. Pl. 1788)	Pennsylvania Court of Common Pleas
Abbot v. Pinchin	349 (Pa. Ct. Com. Pl. 1788)	Pennsylvania Court of Common Pleas
Oxley v. Cowperthwaite	349 (Pa. Ct. Com. Pl. 1788)	Pennsylvania Court of Common Pleas
Rapelje v. Emory	349 (Pa. Ct. Com. Pl. 1788)	Pennsylvania Court of Common Pleas
Walton v. Willis	351 (Pa. 1788)	Supreme Court of Pennsylvania
Respublica v. Campbell	354 (Pa. 1788)	Supreme Court of Pennsylvania
Ross v. Clarke	354 (Pa. 1788)	Supreme Court of Pennsylvania
Hart v. James	355 (Pa. 1788)	Supreme Court of Pennsylvania
Starrett's Case	356 (Pa. 1788)	Supreme Court of Pennsylvania
Respublica v. Sparhawk	357 (Pa. 1788)	Supreme Court of Pennsylvania
Kunckle v. Kunckle	364 (Pa. Ct. Com. Pl. 1788)	Pennsylvania Court of Common Pleas
Gorgerat v. McCarty	366 (Pa. Ct. Com. Pl. 1788)	Pennsylvania Court of Common Pleas
Waters v. Millar	369 (Pa. Ct. Com. Pl. 1788)	Pennsylvania Court of Common Pleas
Gibbs v. Gibbs	371 (Pa. Ct. Com. Pl. 1788)	Pennsylvania Court of Common Pleas
McClenachan v. McCarty	375 (Pa. Ct. Com. Pl. 1788)	Pennsylvania Court of Common Pleas
Penrose v. Hart	378 (Pa. Ct. Com. Pl. 1788)	Pennsylvania Court of Common Pleas
Elliot v. Elliot	379 (Pa. Ct. Com. Pl. 1788)	Pennsylvania Court of Common Pleas
O'Neil v. Chew	379 (Pa. Ct. Com. Pl. 1788)	Pennsylvania Court of Common Pleas
Weaver v. Lawrence	379 (Pa. Ct. Com. Pl. 1788)	Pennsylvania Court of Common Pleas
Pleasants v. Meng	380 (Pa. Ct. Com. Pl. 1788)	Pennsylvania Court of Common Pleas
Farrel v. McClea	392 (Pa. Ct. Com. Pl. 1788)	Pennsylvania Court of Common Pleas
Camp v. Lockwood	393 (Pa. Ct. Com. Pl. 1788)	Pennsylvania Court of Common Pleas
Halhead v. Ross	405 (Pa. 1789)	Supreme Court of Pennsylvania
Pinchin v. Fry	405 (Pa. 1789)	Supreme Court of Pennsylvania
Johnson v. Hocker	406 (Pa. 1789)	Supreme Court of Pennsylvania
Calvert v. Pitt	406 (Pa. 1789)	Supreme Court of Pennsylvania
Steele v. Steele	409 (Pa. 1789)	Supreme Court of Pennsylvania
Robbins v. Whitman	410 (Pa. 1789)	Supreme Court of Pennsylvania
Smith v. Davids	410 (Pa. 1789)	Supreme Court of Pennsylvania
Schlosser v. Lesher	411 (Pa. Ct. Com. Pl. 1789)	Pennsylvania Court of Common Pleas
Kennedy v. Nedrow	415 (Pa. 1789)	Supreme Court of Pennsylvania
Zantzinger v. Pole	419 (Pa. 1789)	Supreme Court of Pennsylvania
Patton v. Caldwell	419 (Pa. 1789)	Supreme Court of Pennsylvania
Hamilton v. Callender's Executor	420 (Pa. 1789)	Supreme Court of Pennsylvania
Thompson's Lessee v. White	424 (Pa. 1789)	Supreme Court of Pennsylvania
De Haven v. Henderson	424 (Pa. 1789)	Supreme Court of Pennsylvania
D'Utricht v. Melchor	428 (Pa. 1789)	Supreme Court of Pennsylvania
Oxley v. Oldden	429 (Pa. 1789)	Supreme Court of Pennsylvania
Levinz v. Will	430 (Pa. 1789)	Supreme Court of Pennsylvania
Parker v. Wood	436 (Pa. 1789)	Supreme Court of Pennsylvania
Quesnel v. Mussi	436 (Pa. 1789)	Supreme Court of Pennsylvania
Phillips v. Hyde	439 (Pa. Ct. Com. Pl. 1789)	Pennsylvania Court of Common Pleas
Holmes v. Comegys	439 (Pa. Ct. Com. Pl. 1789)	Pennsylvania Court of Common Pleas
Adams v. la Comb	440 (Pa. 1789)	Supreme Court of Pennsylvania
McCullough v. Houston	441 (Pa. 1789)	Supreme Court of Pennsylvania
Cummings v. Lynn	444 (Pa. 1789)	Supreme Court of Pennsylvania
Quesnel v. Mussy	449 (Pa. 1789)	Supreme Court of Pennsylvania
Hooton v. Will	450 (Pa. 1789)	Supreme Court of Pennsylvania
Primer v. Kuhn	452 (Pa. 1789)	Supreme Court of Pennsylvania
Græme v. Harris	456 (Pa. 1789)	Supreme Court of Pennsylvania
Bunner v. Neil	457 (Pa. 1789)	Supreme Court of Pennsylvania
Thompson v. Musser	458 (Pa. 1789)	Supreme Court of Pennsylvania
Respublica v. Betsey	469 (Pa. 1789)	Supreme Court of Pennsylvania
Lyle v. Foreman	480 (Pa. Ct. Com. Pl. 1789)	Pennsylvania Court of Common Pleas
Graff v. Smith's Administrators	481 (Pa. Ct. Com. Pl. 1789)	Pennsylvania Court of Common Pleas
Pringle v. McClenachan	486 (Pa. Ct. Com. Pl. 1789)	Pennsylvania Court of Common Pleas
