= Anne Marie Coyle =

American Common court of Pleas Judge

Anne Marie Coyle is a judge at the Philadelphia County Court of Common Pleas in Philadelphia County, Pennsylvania who identifies with the Republican Party. She was elected to the Philadelphia County Court of Common Pleas on November 5, 2013 for a tenure of ten years (2023), and re-elected to a second ten-year tenure in 2023. Judge Coyle was elected as a Democratic Party candidate, but now is a registered Republican.

A Philadelphia Inquirer analysis published in 2019 found that Coyle sentenced people who had violated probation to state prison at a higher rate than any other judge in Philadelphia. That group includes people convicted of low-level crimes like drug possession and shoplifting, who face years in prison for minor violations even though they have not committed new crimes.

Coyle garnered attention during the COVID-19 pandemic for her notable stance on inmate release requests. Over the course of two days, Coyle denied every plea for release and, in four instances, even raised bail amounts. This controversial approach prompted the Defender Association to opt for withdrawing all cases from her jurisdiction, asserting that it was no longer in their client's best interest to present arguments before her. Coyle's decision-making introduced uncertainty into a process that had previously resulted in approximately 380 inmates gaining early release. Her history of contentious sentencing and prior clashes with the District Attorney's Office further contributed to the scrutiny surrounding her decisions.

Coyle has a history of blocking developments and overruling decisions by the Zoning Board. She ruled that restaurant had “failed” in its duty, arguing it ignored evidence that the bar would worsen traffic congestion and impede emergency vehicles, even though the restaurant would have been on a main thoroughfare in the city with hundreds of other bars and restaurants. Her decisions have angered both restaurant groups and historic preservationists for their inconsistencies.

In 2024, Coyle ruled in favor of a lawsuit to block a 104-unit affordable apartment building at 50th and Warrington Streets. Coyle stated in her ruling that the apartment building "would unequivocally tower over the surrounding family homes." That same year, she also ruled to block the construction of a five-story, 33-unit apartment building on the lot of a gas station near Chestnut Hill Baptist Church.
