= The King v. Haas =

1764 Supreme Court of Pennsylvania decision

The King v. Haas, 1 U.S. (1 Dall.) 9 (Pa. 1764) is a decision of the Supreme Court of Pennsylvania issued when Pennsylvania was still a British colony. It is among the first decisions that appear in the first volume of United States Reports, and is among the earliest appellate court reports in North America. It is also one of the first reported appellate cases to apply the writ of habeas corpus, then an established principle of English law, in the English colonies that later became the first thirteen states of the United States of America.

== Colonial and early state court cases in the United States Reports ==
None of the decisions appearing in the first volume and most of the second volume of the United States Reports are actually decisions of the United States Supreme Court. Instead, they are decisions from various Pennsylvania courts, dating from the colonial period and the first decade after Independence. Alexander Dallas, a Philadelphia, Pennsylvania lawyer and journalist, had been in the business of reporting these cases for newspapers and periodicals. He subsequently began compiling his case reports in a bound volume, which he called "Reports of cases ruled and adjudged in the courts of Pennsylvania, before and since the Revolution". This would come to be known as the first volume of Dallas Reports.

When the United States Supreme Court, along with the rest of the new Federal Government, moved in 1791 to the nation's temporary capital in Philadelphia, Dallas was appointed the Supreme Court's first unofficial and unpaid Supreme Court Reporter. (Court reporters in that age received no salary, but were expected to profit from the publication and sale of their compiled decisions.) Dallas continued to collect and publish Pennsylvania decisions in a second volume of his Reports, and when the Supreme Court began hearing cases, he added those cases to his reports, starting towards the end of the second volume, 2 Dallas Reports. Dallas would go on to publish a total of 4 volumes of decisions during his tenure as Reporter.

In 1874, the U.S. government created the United States Reports, and numbered the volumes previously published privately as part of that series, starting from the first volume of Dallas Reports. The four volumes Dallas published were retitled volumes 1–4 of United States Reports. As a result, decisions appearing in these early reports have dual citation forms; one for the volume number of the United States Reports, and one for the set of reports named for the reporter (called nominative reports). For example, the complete citation to The King v. Haas is 1 U.S. (1 Dall.) 9 (Pa. 1764).

== The decision ==
Dallas's report of this case, as with many of his early decisions, does not include the actual language of the Pennsylvania Supreme Court's decision, but only describes the proceedings in the incomplete and general terms that have evoked criticism from later generations. The nature of the accusation against Mr. Haas (and the unnamed "others" mentioned in the title of the case) are lost to history. What is known is that the defendant asked the court to compel the prosecutor to either bring the case to trial, or dismiss it. ("discharge the Defendant.") It is not known how long the defendant had awaited trial prior to his motion.

The court denied the defendant's motion, saying that it would not compel the Attorney General to act unless the defendant demonstrated that he suffered some type of oppression as a result of the Attorney General's delay.

== Habeas corpus and speedy trial in colonial courts ==
Dallas's report of the case includes a footnote that makes mention of a habeas corpus statute enacted on February 18, 1705. Such an enactment would appear to be a Pennsylvania colonial statute modeled on the English Habeas Corpus Act 1679 which had repeatedly been interpreted not to apply to the North American colonies. However, the language of the Pennsylvania act is unknown, and it may not have been in effect in any case. The British crown frequently repealed such colonial enactments. At any rate, Dallas's report includes so little of the detail of the case, including the charges laid, the date of Haas's arrest, or the date the indictment came down, that no meaningful habeas corpus analysis is possible. Nor is it possible to determine whether Haas sought a speedy trial. What is clear is that at this stage of colonial development, Haas appears to have no rights to either habeas corpus, or to a speedy trial of whatever charge(s) he faced.

== See also ==
- United States Reports, volume 1
