= Nixon v. Long =

Nixon v. Long, 1 U.S. (1 Dall.) 6 (Pa. 1762) is a decision of the Supreme Court of Pennsylvania, issued when Pennsylvania was still a British colony. It is among the first decisions that appear in the first volume of United States Reports.

== Colonial and early state court cases in the United States Reports ==
None of the decisions appearing in the first volume and most of the second volume of the United States Reports are actually decisions of the United States Supreme Court. Instead, they are decisions from various Pennsylvania courts, dating from the colonial period and the first decade after independence. Alexander Dallas, a Philadelphia, Pennsylvania lawyer and journalist, had been in the business of reporting these cases for newspapers and periodicals. He subsequently began compiling his case reports in a bound volume, which he called Reports of cases ruled and adjudged in the courts of Pennsylvania, before and since the Revolution. This would come to be known as the first volume of Dallas Reports.

When the United States Supreme Court, along with the rest of the new Federal Government, moved in 1791 to the nation's temporary capital in Philadelphia, Dallas was appointed the Supreme Court's first unofficial and unpaid Supreme Court Reporter. (Court reporters in that age received no salary, but were expected to profit from the publication and sale of their compiled decisions.) Dallas continued to collect and publish Pennsylvania decisions in a second volume of his Reports, and when the Supreme Court began hearing cases, he added those cases to his reports, starting towards the end of the second volume, 2 Dallas Reports. Dallas would go on to publish a total of 4 volumes of decisions during his tenure as Reporter.

In 1874, the U.S. government created the United States Reports, and numbered the volumes previously published privately as part of that series, starting from the first volume of Dallas Reports. The four volumes Dallas published were retitled volumes 1 - 4 of United States Reports. As a result, the complete citation to Nixon v. Long is 1 U.S. (1 Dall.) 6 (Pa. 1762).

== The decision ==
Little is known about the nature of the case or the specific legal dispute at issue in this case. Possibly, the case involved a dispute over ownership (title) to the cargo of a vessel – perhaps merchandise consigned to the master of a cargo vessel who was charged to deliver the cargo to a destination, sell that cargo and then return the proceeds to the consignor. Another possibility is that a government official may have taken action against a vessel, its passengers, its crew, or its cargo. But Dallas's report of the case gives neither the facts of the case nor the specifics of the legal issue whose decision he was reporting.

What is clear is that for some reason, the master of a sailing vessel issued a protest to some action that some person or entity was undertaking. The court's decision was that the master's protest was allowed to be given into evidence.

Despite the lack of context for the court's decision, it has been cited in several later state and federal court opinions.

== See also ==
- United States Reports, volume 1
