= Stevenson v. Pemberton =

Stevenson v. Pemberton, 1 U.S. (1 Dall.) 3 (Pa. 1760) is a decision of the Supreme Court of Pennsylvania, issued when Pennsylvania was still a British colony. It is among the first decisions that appear in the first volume of United States Reports.

== Colonial court decisions in the United States Reports ==
None of the decisions appearing in the first volume and most of the second volume of the United States Reports are actually decisions of the United States Supreme Court. Instead, they are decisions from various Pennsylvania courts, dating from the colonial period and the first decade after Independence. Alexander Dallas, a Philadelphia, Pennsylvania, lawyer and journalist, had been in the business of publishing and selling these cases for newspapers and periodicals. He subsequently began compiling and selling these cases in a bound volume, which he called "Reports of cases ruled and adjudged in the courts of Pennsylvania, before and since the Revolution". This would come to be known as the first volume of "Dallas Reports."

When the United States Supreme Court, along with the rest of the new Federal Government, moved in 1791 to the nation's temporary capital in Philadelphia, Dallas was appointed the Supreme Court's first unofficial and unpaid Supreme Court Reporter. (Court reporters in that age received no salary, but were expected to profit from the publication and sale of their compiled decisions.) Dallas continued to collect and publish Pennsylvania decisions in a second volume of his Reports, and when the Supreme Court began hearing cases he added those cases to his reports, starting towards the end of the second volume, "2 Dallas Reports". Dallas would go on to publish a total of 4 volumes of decisions during his tenure as Reporter.

In 1874, the U.S. government created the United States Reports, and numbered the volumes previously published privately as part of that series, starting from the first volume of Dallas Reports. The four volumes Dallas published were retitled volumes 1 - 4 of United States Reports. As a result, the complete citation to Stevenson v Pemberton is 1 U.S. (1 Dall.) 3 (Pa. 1759).

== The decision ==
A party known only as "C" in Dallas's annotations, who resided in the West Indies, was indebted to both Pemberton and to Stevenson. After Pemberton corresponded with C asking for security for the debt, C sent a quantity of rum to Pemberton, with directions that Pemberton sell the rum and apply the proceeds to C's debt to Pemberton and then to specified others creditors. Before Pemberton could sell the rum, Stevenson, who already held a judgment against C, sued Pemberton, seeking a writ of scire facias establishing Stevenson's right to the rum, or to first right to the proceeds of its sale. As Dallas wrote, "The Question on these Facts, as found by a special Verdict, was, Whether P[emberton]. should retain the Goods for the Payment of his own Debt, or whether the Property remained in C, so as to be liable to the Attachment of S[tevenson]?

Stevenson's lawyer argued that since C consigned the rum to Pemberton with instructions to sell it on C's account, the rum remained the property of C, and was thus subject to Stevenson's attachment. Pemberton's lawyer argued that C sent it to Pemberton as security for C's debt to Pemberton and other "Dutch Bill Creditors" thereby vesting Pemberton with a special property interest (what in modern parlance is called a "security interest") that preceded Stevenson's interest until C's debt to Pemberton was satisfied.

The court noted that if C had sent money to Pemberton in payment of his debt, Pemberton would clearly have had superior claim to that money. The court then held that the fact that C sent a commodity (the rum) which had to be converted to money before Pemberton could be paid, made no difference, and Pemberton's claim was upheld. According to the decision, "the whole Court" gave judgment for Pemberton—thus it appears that the decision was unanimous.

== Precedential effect ==
In the century after its publication, Stevenson v Pemberton would be cited as precedent for the proposition that chattels consigned or delivered from one party to a second party, in satisfaction of a prior debt owed to the second party, or for the benefit of a third party, becomes the property of the second (or the third party, if there is such) upon such consignment or delivery, and are thus not subject to attachment by creditors of the first party. The last time that it was cited by federal courts was by the United States Supreme Court in Grove v. Brien, 49 U.S. (8 How.) 429 (1850).

== See also ==
- United States Reports, volume 1
