= Price v. Watkins =

Price v. Watkins, 1 U.S. (1 Dall.) 8 (Pa. 1763) was a decision of the Supreme Court of Pennsylvania in which the court held that, when a testator's will instructs that some property should be held until a future date and then sold for the benefit of some others, the future interest held by those others vested upon the testator's death. The typical scenario where this would be controversial is when one of the future beneficiaries of the sale dies before the interim owner of the property. For instance, consider a will specifying that property is to be held by the testator's wife until her death and then sold to benefit their children. If one of the children dies before the wife, the rule from Price v. Watkins would allot that deceased child a share of the property's sale and determine who should receive the property as if the share was part of that deceased child's estate—because, as vested property, it is.

Price v. Watkins was among the first decisions published in the first volume of United States Reports. It was issued while Pennsylvania was still a British colony.

== Colonial and Early State Court Cases in the United States Reports ==
None of the decisions appearing in the first volume and most of the second volume of the United States Reports are actually decisions of the United States Supreme Court. Instead, they are decisions from various Pennsylvania courts, dating from the colonial period and the first decade after Independence. Alexander Dallas, a Philadelphia, Pennsylvania, lawyer and journalist, had been in the business of reporting these cases for newspapers and periodicals. He subsequently began compiling his case reports in a bound volume, which he called "Reports of cases ruled and adjudged in the courts of Pennsylvania, before and since the Revolution". This would come to be known as the first volume of "Dallas Reports."

When the United States Supreme Court, along with the rest of the new Federal Government, moved in 1791 to the nation's temporary capital in Philadelphia, Dallas was appointed the Supreme Court's first unofficial and unpaid Supreme Court Reporter. (Court reporters in that age received no salary, but were expected to profit from the publication and sale of their compiled decisions.) Dallas continued to collect and publish Pennsylvania decisions in a second volume of his Reports, and when the Supreme Court began hearing cases, he added those cases to his reports, starting towards the end of the second volume, "2 Dallas Reports". Dallas would go on to publish a total of 4 volumes of decisions during his tenure as Reporter.

In 1874, the U.S. government created the United States Reports, and numbered the volumes previously published privately as part of that series, starting from the first volume of Dallas Reports. The four volumes Dallas published were retitled volumes 1 - 4 of United States Reports. As a result, the complete citation to Price v. Watkins is 1 U.S. (1 Dall.) 8 (Pa. 1763).

== The Decision ==
Dallas's report of the case states that a man named Price made a will which included a provision for the disposition of his house. Price's will stated that after his wife Ruth Price died or remarried, the house was to be bequeathed in trust to I.W. (the "Watkins" party to the litigation) and to M.K., for I.W. and/or M.K. to sell. The proceeds of the sale were to be divided among Price's children as they each reached the age of 21 years, or married, whichever came first.

Price's son Samuel reached the age of 21 and married, but then died, predeceasing Ruth. Ruth Price subsequently died, and the trustees Watkins and M.K. sold the Price house and held the proceeds of that sale. The Administratrix of Samuel Price's estate (probably Samuel Price's widow) then sued Watkins for Samuel's proportional share of the proceeds.

The legal issue was whether the testator's bequest constituted a vested legacy to Samuel, in which case his share was his (and his estate's after his death); or whether Samuel's legacy lapsed because Samuel died before Ruth died, and thus before the testators had the power to sell the house.

Samuel's Administratrix argued that the will directed that in any event, the house be sold when Ruth died or remarried, so that the bequest was of money, not real estate. (The rules for the inheritance of real estate were different from the rules for the inheritance of personal property or money). Since there was no contingency regarding the sale of the real estate, and both of the contingencies occurred which would vest Samuel's legacy (he reached the age of 21, and he married), his share was vested, and could not be denied him, even though he had died. Thus, Samuel's share should be paid to his estate.

Watkins, the trustee under Price's will, argued that since the legacy arose out of real estate, and the real estate could not be sold until Ruth Price died, that Samuel's interest could not vest until Ruth's death. Since Samuel predeceased Ruth, he died without his legacy vesting. Samuel's share, therefore, should go back into the original testator's estate, to be divided among his heirs.

Dallas's report of the case only states that the court decided that Samuel Price's legacy was a vested legacy, and gave judgment in the favor of Samuel's Administratrix. There is no report of the court's legal analysis.

== Precedential Effect ==
Price v. Watkins would be cited for the next two centuries in various state and Federal courts for the rule that when a testator bequeaths a life estate in his surviving spouse, with the premises (or the proceeds of the sale thereof) going to the testator's children after the death of the surviving spouse, the legacy to the child or children vests at the time of the testator's death. This question would most commonly arise where, as occurred in Price, a testator's widow outlived a child, and the child's heirs sought the child's share of the original testator's estate. The last known citation to Price by a court of record was in the Iowa Supreme Court's decision in Atchison v. Francis, 182 Iowa 37, 165 N.W. 587 (1917).
