= Hewes v. M'Dowell =

Hewes v. M'Dowell, 1 U.S. (1 Dall.) 5 (Pa. 1762) is a decision of the Supreme Court of Pennsylvania, issued when Pennsylvania was still a British colony. It is among the first decisions that appear in the first volume of United States Reports.

== Colonial and state court decisions in the United States Reports ==
None of the decisions appearing in the first volume and most of the second volume of the United States Reports are actually decisions of the United States Supreme Court. Instead, they are decisions from various Pennsylvania courts, dating from the colonial period and the first decade after Independence. Alexander Dallas, a Philadelphia, Pennsylvania lawyer and journalist, had been in the business of publishing and selling these cases for newspapers and periodicals. He subsequently began compiling and selling these cases in a bound volume, which he called "Reports of cases ruled and adjudged in the courts of Pennsylvania, before and since the Revolution". This would come to be known as the first volume of "Dallas Reports."

When the United States Supreme Court, along with the rest of the new Federal Government, moved in 1791 to the nation's temporary capital in Philadelphia, Dallas was appointed the Supreme Court's first unofficial and unpaid Supreme Court Reporter. (Court reporters in that age received no salary, but were expected to profit from the publication and sale of their compiled decisions.) Dallas continued to collect and publish Pennsylvania decisions in a second volume of his Reports, and when the Supreme Court began hearing cases, he added those cases to his reports, starting towards the end of the second volume, "2 Dallas Reports". Dallas would go on to publish a total of 4 volumes of decisions during his tenure as Reporter.

In 1874, the U.S. government created the United States Reports, and numbered the volumes previously published privately as part of that series, starting from the first volume of Dallas Reports. The four volumes Dallas published were retitled volumes 1 - 4 of United States Reports. As a result, the complete citation to Lessee of Hewes v M'Dowell is 1 U.S. (1 Dall.) 5 (Pa. 1762).

== The decision ==
According to Dallas's annotations, the case involved the description of a tract of land within the Pennsylvania colony. The issue was whether the Book of Memorandums of the Secretary of the Land Office, which bore the Warrant of Survey conducted by the Surveyor General, was admissible into evidence. Dallas reports that the Court noted that the Book was "of Consequence" and that the Court urged "the other side" (which side, is not revealed) to consent to the Book's being given in evidence. The "other side" agreed, and the Book was given into evidence. Beyond that, the Court purportedly made no decision regarding its admissibility into evidence.

However, the language of the decision itself suggests that the Court did in fact make a determination that the Book was admissible, and allowed it to be presented to the jury. The seeming lack of agreement between Dallas's notes of the case, and the purported language of the Court's decision has apparently never been reconciled.

== Precedential effect ==
A year later, the Supreme Court of Pennsylvania would cite M'Dowell as precedent for the admission of an order for a land survey in Fothergill's Lessee v. Stover, another case involving irregularities in the processing of land grants.

== See also ==
- United States Reports, volume 1
