= Richardson's Lessee v. Campbell =

Lessee of Richardson v. Campbell, 1 U.S. 10 (1764) is a decision of a Pennsylvania provincial court, issued when Pennsylvania was still an English colony. It is among the first decisions that appear in the first volume of United States Reports, and is among the earliest surviving reports of judicial proceedings in North America. It is also one of the first applications of the Statute of Frauds, then an established principle of English law, in the English colonies that later became the first thirteen states of the United States of America.

== Colonial and Early State Court Cases in the United States Reports ==
None of the decisions appearing in the first volume and most of the second volume of the United States Reports are actually decisions of the United States Supreme Court. Instead, they are decisions from various Pennsylvania courts, dating from the colonial period and the first decade after Independence. Alexander Dallas, a Philadelphia, Pennsylvania lawyer and journalist, had been in the business of reporting these cases for newspapers and periodicals. He subsequently began compiling his case reports in a bound volume, which he called "Reports of cases ruled and adjudged in the courts of Pennsylvania, before and since the Revolution". This would come to be known as the first volume of "Dallas Reports."

When the United States Supreme Court, along with the rest of the new Federal Government, moved in 1791 to the nation's temporary capital in Philadelphia, Dallas was appointed the Supreme Court's first unofficial and unpaid Supreme Court Reporter. (Court reporters in that age received no salary, but were expected to profit from the publication and sale of their compiled decisions.) Dallas continued to collect and publish Pennsylvania decisions in a second volume of his Reports, and when the Supreme Court began hearing cases, he added those cases to his reports, starting towards the end of the second volume, "2 Dallas Reports". Dallas would go on to publish a total of 4 volumes of decisions during his tenure as Reporter.

In 1874, the U.S. government created the United States Reports, and numbered the volumes previously published privately as part of that series, starting from the first volume of Dallas Reports. The four volumes Dallas published were retitled volumes 1 - 4 of United States Reports. As a result, decisions appearing in these early reports have dual citation forms; one for the volume number of the United States Reports, and one for the set of reports named for the reporter (called nominative reports). For example, the complete citation to Lessee of Richardson v. Campbell is 1 U.S. 10 (1 Dallas 10) (1764).

== The Decision ==
Dallas's report of this case, as with many of his early decisions, does not include the actual language of the court's decision, but only describes the proceedings in the incomplete and general terms that has evoked criticism from later generations.

As with many of the first cases reported by Dallas, this case involved a dispute over title to land in the Pennsylvania colony. The unnamed plaintiff, a tenant (lessee) of landowner Richardson, and whose right to possession of the leased land depended on Richardson's good title to the land, thus found himself defending Richardson's title to the land. The tenant sued Campbell, an opposing claimant to the same real property. The plaintiff offered a patent dated 1762, which granted title in the disputed land to Richardson, or Richardson's predecessor in title. The defendant Campbell offered receipts showing payments made to the Secretary of the Land Office, one Mr. Peters, several years prior to Richardson's patent. The plaintiff argued that those payments were for an adjacent tract of land.

The defendant Campbell then offered a witness who was prepared to testify that Thomas Penn, the son of Pennsylvania colony founder William Penn, and who had been Proprietor of the Colony of Pennsylvania during the relevant times, had verbally stated that the land in dispute had been sold to Campbell. The plaintiff objected to this testimony, and the Court refused to allow the witness to testify.

== The Statute of Frauds in Colonial Courts ==
Though not mentioned by name, this case appears to be one of the first applications of the Statute of Frauds in the colonies. That rule, enacted by the British Parliament over eighty years before this decision was rendered, required (and in versions passed in every state in the Union still requires today) that certain transactions, including transactions involving interests in land, must be in writing, signed by the party against whom the transaction is sought to be enforced. The Court specifically ruled that the evidence of Thomas Penn's parol (verbal) transaction would not be admitted at the trial of this case.

== Precedential Effect ==
The principle that transactions involving interests in land had to be in writing, signed by the "party to be charged" was well established by the Revolution, and appears in numerous colonial and early state court decisions. Infrequently, this decision was cited in support of that proposition. This decision was last known to be cited in or by a court of record in 1872, by a litigant in Kraut's Appeal, 71 Pa. 64, (Pa. 1872) who cited it before the Pennsylvania Supreme Court for the premise that the right to pass through defendants' house could not be shown by parol (that is, verbal evidence).

== See also ==
- List of United States Supreme Court cases, volume 1
