= Fothergill's Lessee v. Stover =

Lessee of Fothergill v. Fothergill, 1 U.S. (1 Dall.) 6 (Pa. 1763) is a decision of the Supreme Court of Pennsylvania, issued when Pennsylvania was still a British colony. It is among the first decisions that appear in the first volume of United States Reports.

== Colonial and early state court cases in the United States Reports ==
None of the decisions appearing in the first volume and most of the second volume of the United States Reports are actually decisions of the United States Supreme Court. Instead, they are decisions from various Pennsylvania courts, dating from the colonial period and the first decade after independence. Alexander Dallas, a Philadelphia, Pennsylvania lawyer and journalist, had been in the business of reporting these cases for newspapers and periodicals. He subsequently began compiling his case reports in a bound volume, which he called Reports of cases ruled and adjudged in the courts of Pennsylvania, before and since the Revolution. This would come to be known as the first volume of Dallas Reports.

When the United States Supreme Court, along with the rest of the new Federal Government, moved in 1791 to the nation's temporary capital in Philadelphia, Dallas was appointed the Supreme Court's first unofficial and unpaid Supreme Court Reporter. (Court reporters in that age received no salary, but were expected to profit from the publication and sale of their compiled decisions.) Dallas continued to collect and publish Pennsylvania decisions in a second volume of his Reports, and when the Supreme Court began hearing cases, he added those cases to his reports, starting towards the end of the second volume, 2 Dallas Reports. Dallas would go on to publish a total of 4 volumes of decisions during his tenure as Reporter.

In 1874, the U.S. government created the United States Reports, and numbered the volumes previously published privately as part of that series, starting from the first volume of Dallas Reports. The four volumes Dallas published were retitled volumes 1 - 4 of United States Reports. As a result, the complete citation to Lessee of Fothergill v. Stover is 1 U.S. (1 Dall.) 6 (Pa. 1763).

== The decision ==
Lessee of Fothergill v. Stover involved a dispute over title to land. The issue before the Court was whether an order, written in 1719 by James Steel, the Receiver General and Secretary of the Land Office, addressed to Isaac Taylor, the Surveyor General's Deputy in Chester County, stating that James Logan, one of three Proprietors or Commissioners of Land in the Pennsylvania Territory had granted 500 acres (2.0 km^{2}) of land to William Willis, and directing that Willis's land be surveyed so a warrant could be issued, was admissible as evidence of title.

The plaintiff, who appears to have claimed the same land through a warrant and survey issued some years later, opposed admission of the order, arguing that the survey order alone, without an actual warrant issued by the Proprietors or Commissioners of Property, was not sufficient to endow Willis with title to the land, nor to set forth the boundaries of that land. (If Willis did not have clear title to the land, then he could not pass title on, ultimately to Stover.) The plaintiff further argued that Logan was only one of three Commissioners, and was without authority to issue a Warrant of Lands on his own.

The Court ruled that it had been common practice for land to be granted by the use of orders from the Proprietor's Officers such as the letter order at issue here. The court noted that a year earlier, in the case of Hewes v. M'Dowell, a similar order had been ruled admissible, and that therefore, the order at issue was given into evidence.

Also considered as evidence was the actual survey completed by Isaac Taylor in 1720, bearing the notation "William Willis, 400 acres (1.6 km^{2})", even though, according to Dallas's annotations, the survey was never returned to the land office, but found among Taylor's survey papers some years after his death.

Dallas's notes also indicate that this matter was subsequently appealed to the King and Council, who affirmed the Supreme Court's ruling.

== Precedential effect ==
Lessee of Fothergill v. Stover, or as it is sometimes known, Fothergill's Lessee v. Stover, would be cited frequently in later years by other courts. In Sims' Lessee v. Irvine, 3 U.S. 425 (1799), the United States Supreme Court would cite it as evidence of the confusion in Pennsylvania between the concepts of legal title and equitable title. As late as 1959, the Air Force Board of Review in the case of United States v. Bean cited Fothergill for the proposition that official letters and communications written by public officials in the course of their duties are admissible to the same extent that official records and reports are admissible.

== See also ==
- United States Reports, volume 1
