= Lessee of Ashton v. Ashton =

Lessee of Ashton v. Ashton, 1 U.S. (1 Dall.) 4 (Pa. 1760) is a decision of the Supreme Court of Pennsylvania issued when Pennsylvania was still a British colony. It is among the first decisions that appear in the first volume of United States Reports.

== Colonial and Early State Court Cases in the United States Reports ==
None of the decisions appearing in the first volume and most of the second volume of the United States Reports are actually decisions of the United States Supreme Court. Instead, they are decisions from various Pennsylvania courts, dating from the colonial period and the first decade after Independence. Alexander Dallas, a Philadelphia, Pennsylvania lawyer and journalist, had been in the business of reporting these cases for newspapers and periodicals. He subsequently began compiling his case reports in a bound volume, which he called Reports of cases ruled and adjudged in the courts of Pennsylvania, before and since the Revolution. This would come to be known as the first volume of Dallas Reports.

When the United States Supreme Court, along with the rest of the new Federal Government, moved in 1791 to the nation's temporary capital in Philadelphia, Dallas was appointed the Supreme Court's first unofficial and unpaid Supreme Court Reporter. (Court reporters in that age received no salary, but were expected to profit from the publication and sale of their compiled decisions.) Dallas continued to collect and publish Pennsylvania decisions in a second volume of his Reports, and when the Supreme Court began hearing cases, he added those cases to his reports, starting towards the end of the second volume, 2 Dallas Reports. Dallas would go on to publish a total of four volumes of decisions during his tenure as Reporter.

In 1874, the U.S. government created the United States Reports, and numbered the volumes previously published privately as part of that series, starting from the first volume of Dallas Reports. The four volumes Dallas published were retitled volumes 1 - 4 of United States Reports. As a result, the complete citation to Lessee of Ashton v Ashton is 1 U.S. (1 Dall.) 4 (Pa. 1760).

== The Decision ==
According to Dallas's annotations, an unknown party known only as the "deviser" (the maker of a will by which real property is given as a gift after death), made a will by which he devised real estate to "the first Heir Male of I. S. when he shall Arrive to the Age of 21 Years" so long as that first male heir of I. S. paid the sum of 40 pounds to each of I. S.'s daughters, designated "A" and "B". When the deviser died, I. S. only had the two daughters. Some time later, I. S. had a son, who reached the age of 21 years and paid his two sisters their 40 pounds each.

The issue before the court was whether the son of I. S. could take under the deviser's will. Dallas reported that the defendant made three arguments. First, since the son of I. S. did not exist either at the time the will was made, or at the time of the deviser's death, the son could not take under the will. Second, even if the devise might be construed as a "future devise", the interest was too remote under the rule that a future interest must take effect within the lifetime of a life in being at the time of the deviser's death, (or within 9 months thereafter, in the event of an unborn heir). Moreover, even if one of I. S.'s daughters, or granddaughters, or an even later female descendant bore a son, who might arguably become I. S.'s male heir, that heir could not inherit under the rule against perpetuities. The third argument was that, since I. S. was apparently still alive, he could have no heir under the legal maxim "Nemo est Hares Viventis". ("No one is the heir of a living person.")

The plaintiff responded by arguing, first that this was not a "present Devise", because the devisor would have known at the time he made his will that I. S. did not at that time have a male heir. Second, the "Contingency" (that I. S. would have a son that reached the age of 21 and paid his two sisters their 40 pounds each), was not too remote for purposes of the rule against perpetuities, because it was clear that the devisor intended that the first son of I. S. take, not some more distant descendant, and that the deviser's intent should be respected.

The court ruled that the deviser's clear intent was that first son of I. S. should take, and that his intentions should be enforced.

It is not clear from the record of the decision or from Dallas's annotations what relationship "the deviser" or I. S. or the son of I. S. had to either Ashton or Ashton's Lessee, the parties to the proceeding before the court.

== Precedential Effect ==
Over a century after Lessee of Ashton v. Ashton (or as it is sometimes cited, Ashton v. Ashton) was decided, the Supreme Court of Pennsylvania would cite it as precedent for the proposition that the word "heirs" means "children" in the case of Appeal of Porter 45 Pa. 201 (1863)

== See also ==
- United States Reports, volume 1
