= The King v. Lukens =

The King v. Lukens, 1 U.S. (1 Dall.) 5 (Pa. 1762) is a decision of the Supreme Court of Pennsylvania, issued when Pennsylvania was still a British colony. It is among the first decisions that appear in the first volume of United States Reports.

== Colonial and early State Court cases in the United States Reports ==
None of the decisions appearing in the first volume and most of the second volume of the United States Reports are actually decisions of the United States Supreme Court. Instead, they are decisions from various Pennsylvania courts, dating from the colonial period and the first decade after Independence. Alexander Dallas, a Philadelphia, Pennsylvania lawyer and journalist, had been in the business of reporting these cases for newspapers and periodicals. He subsequently began compiling his case reports in a bound volume, which he called "Reports of cases ruled and adjudged in the courts of Pennsylvania, before and since the Revolution". This would come to be known as the first volume of "Dallas Reports".

When the United States Supreme Court, along with the rest of the new Federal Government, moved in 1791 to the nation's temporary capital in Philadelphia, Dallas was appointed the Supreme Court's first unofficial and unpaid Supreme Court Reporter. (Court reporters in that age received no salary, but were expected to profit from the publication and sale of their compiled decisions.) Dallas continued to collect and publish Pennsylvania decisions in a second volume of his Reports, and when the Supreme Court began hearing cases, he added those cases to his reports, starting towards the end of the second volume, "2 Dallas Reports". Dallas would go on to publish a total of 4 volumes of decisions during his tenure as Reporter.

In 1874, the U.S. government created the United States Reports, and numbered the volumes previously published privately as part of that series, starting from the first volume of Dallas Reports. The four volumes Dallas published were retitled volumes 1 - 4 of United States Reports. As a result, the complete citation to The King v. Lukens is 1 U.S. (1 Dall.) 5 (Pa. 1760).

== The decision ==
According to Dallas's annotations, John Lukens had been indicted by a grand jury for nuisance. A statute enacted in 1705 and in force when this indictment was issued, required that any indictment be endorsed by the prosecutor.

However, grand juries in that age had far more power and acted far more independently than they generally do today. Any person, not merely the prosecutor, could bring a criminal complaint to a grand jury for its consideration, and the grand jury could conduct its own investigation into alleged criminal behavior before handing down an indictment. Thus, it was not uncommon for a grand jury to proceed to indictment without any involvement by a prosecutor whatsoever. The indictment against Lukens appears to have been just such a case. One note suggests that a constable may have presented a complaint or case to the grand jury, for there is mention of a constable's return after the indictment was issued by the grand jury.

The question before the court was whether the prosecution against Lukens could proceed without the endorsement of the prosecutor. Lukens' attorney, a Mr. Dickerson, argued that the statute required the naming or endorsement of a prosecutor before Lukens should have to plead to the charge, the first stage of a criminal prosecution. Mr. Chew, the Attorney General, argued that the statute only intended that a prosecutor be named where there was a prosecutor on the case. Otherwise, Chew argued, a prosecutor need not be so endorsed. Dickerson's position, he noted, would result in many criminals escaping justice, as many cases were brought by grand juries and justices of the peace without the participation of a prosecutor.

The court agreed with Chew, ruled that a prosecutor need be named only when and where a prosecutor is involved, and directed Lukens to answer the plea.

Little else is known about the case against Lukens.

== Precedential effect ==
Over a century and a half after The King v. Lukens was decided, the United States District Court for the Western District of Pennsylvania in the case of U.S. v. Wetmore, 218 F. 227 (W.D. Pa. 1914) would cite Lukens as precedent for the proposition that no endorsement of a prosecutor was necessary where no person was actively carrying on the prosecution. In that case, indictments were brought by a grand jury investigating alleged fraud against the United States by contractors providing substandard materials for the Panama Canal project. Once again, a grand jury, rather than a prosecutor (in this case the United States Attorney), initiated criminal proceedings, and once again, the indictment was without a prosecutor's endorsement. And again, a court held that if there is no prosecutor, the indictment need not be endorsed by one.

== Additional references ==
- Hall, Kermit, ed. Oxford Companion to the Supreme Court of the United States (Oxford 1992),
- Goebel, Jr., Julius, The Oliver Wendell Holmes Devise History of the Supreme Court of the United States Volume 1: Antecedents and Beginnings to 1801 (Macmillan, 1971)
- Walters, jr., Raymond Alexander Dallas: Lawyer -- Politician -- Financier, 1759 - 1817 (Da Capo Press, 1969)
- Free access text of decision

== See also ==
- United States Reports, volume 1
