= Wallace v. Child =

Wallace v. Child, 1 U.S. (1 Dall.) 7 (Pa. 1763) is a decision of the Supreme Court of Pennsylvania, issued when Pennsylvania was still a British colony. It is among the first decisions that appear in the first volume of United States Reports.

== Colonial and Early State Court Cases in the United States Reports ==
None of the decisions appearing in the first volume and most of the second volume of the United States Reports are actually decisions of the United States Supreme Court. Instead, they are decisions from various Pennsylvania courts, dating from the colonial period and the first decade after Independence. Alexander Dallas, a Philadelphia, Pennsylvania, lawyer and journalist, had been in the business of reporting these cases for newspapers and periodicals. He subsequently began compiling his case reports in a bound volume, which he called "Reports of cases ruled and adjudged in the courts of Pennsylvania, before and since the Revolution". This would come to be known as the first volume of "Dallas Reports."

When the United States Supreme Court, along with the rest of the new Federal Government, moved in 1791 to the nation's temporary capital in Philadelphia, Dallas was appointed the Supreme Court's first unofficial and unpaid Supreme Court Reporter. (Court reporters in that age received no salary, but were expected to profit from the publication and sale of their compiled decisions.) Dallas continued to collect and publish Pennsylvania decisions in a second volume of his Reports, and when the Supreme Court began hearing cases, he added those cases to his reports, starting towards the end of the second volume, "2 Dallas Reports". Dallas would go on to publish a total of 4 volumes of decisions during his tenure as Reporter.

In 1874, the U.S. government created the United States Reports, and numbered the volumes previously published privately as part of that series, starting from the first volume of Dallas Reports. The four volumes Dallas published were retitled volumes 1 - 4 of United States Reports. As a result, the complete citation to Wallace v. Child is 1 U.S. (1 Dall.) 7 (Pa. 1763).

== The Decision ==
This was a suit to recover on an insurance policy. A cargo ship, apparently en route to Madeira, sprang a leak and was forced to divert to Providence, Rhode Island. This resulted in a claim against an insurance policy, presumably to cover spoilage or other financial loss. The underwriter apparently refused to pay the claim, resulting in this litigation.

The master of the vessel was called as a witness to testify regarding the cargo on board the vessel, and as to what occurred during the voyage and after the vessel put into Providence. His testimony was objected to, and it was argued that since the master had his own cargo aboard, and had made his own insurance claim which remained outstanding at the time of this trial, that the master was "interested" (had a financial interest in) the litigation, and his testimony would thus be inadmissible.

In response, the party seeking to admit the master's testimony (probably the plaintiff) argued that the master was the only person who could testify as to all that had happened. Further, the defendants' theory of the case was that the insured cargo was not lawful to transport from Carolina to Madeira; however, the master's cargo was to be landed at London, where it was apparently not illegal. Thus, the argument went, the resolution of the master's insurance claim was not dependent on the resolution of this litigation.

The court held that the master would be examined on voir dire. If he were in fact disinterested, he could testify in the case. Dallas's notes indicate that the voir dire examination took place, and that the master's testimony was admitted.

== Precedential Effect ==
Wallace v. Child was apparently only ever cited once, by an underwriter in Ruan v. Gardner, 20 F. Cas. 1295 (C.C. Pa. 1804). There, one of the owners of a vessel seized by privateers made a claim for loss against an insurance policy that covered the vessel and cargo. When the owner proposed to testify, the underwriter objected, noting that the owner was not a disinterested party, because of his contractual obligation to deliver his cargo, and citing Wallace . The court there allowed the owner to testify.

== See also ==
- United States Reports, volume 1
