= Albertson v. Robeson =

Lessee of Albertson v. Robeson
- Court: Supreme Court of Pennsylvania
- Decided: 1764
- Citation: 1 U.S. (1 Dall.) 9 (Pa. 1764)

Holding
- Testimony regarding a parent's statements about a child's age constitutes inadmissible hearsay; a repealed Act is not nullified until notification is received in the colony.

Court membership
- Judges sitting: William Coleman; Alexander Stedman

Lessee of Albertson v. Robeson, 1 U.S. (1 Dall.) 9 (Pa. 1764) is a decision of the Supreme Court of Pennsylvania, issued when Pennsylvania was still a British colony. It is among the first decisions that appear in the first volume of United States Reports.

== Colonial and Early State Court Cases in the United States Reports ==
None of the decisions appearing in the first volume and most of the second volume of the United States Reports are actually decisions of the United States Supreme Court. Instead, they are decisions from various Pennsylvania courts, dating from the colonial period and the first decade after Independence. Alexander Dallas, a Philadelphia, Pennsylvania lawyer and journalist, had been in the business of reporting these cases for newspapers and periodicals. He subsequently began compiling his case reports in a bound volume, which he called “Reports of cases ruled and adjudged in the courts of Pennsylvania, before and since the Revolution”. This would come to be known as the first volume of "Dallas Reports."

When the United States Supreme Court, along with the rest of the new Federal Government, moved in 1791 to the nation's temporary capital in Philadelphia, Dallas was appointed the Supreme Court's first unofficial and unpaid Supreme Court Reporter. (Court reporters in that age received no salary, but were expected to profit from the publication and sale of their compiled decisions.) Dallas continued to collect and publish Pennsylvania decisions in a second volume of his Reports, and when the Supreme Court began hearing cases, he added those cases to his reports, starting towards the end of the second volume, “2 Dallas Reports”. Dallas would go on to publish a total of 4 volumes of decisions during his tenure as Reporter.

In 1874, the U.S. government created the United States Reports, and numbered the volumes previously published privately as part of that series, starting from the first volume of Dallas Reports. The four volumes Dallas published were retitled volumes 1 - 4 of United States Reports. As a result, decisions appearing in these early reports have dual citation forms; one for the volume number of the United States Reports, and one for the set of reports named for the reporter (called nominative reports). For example, the complete citation to Lessee of Albertson v. Robeson is 1 U.S. (1 Dall.) 9 (Pa. 1764).

== Decision ==
The plaintiff's age was apparently at issue in the case, and the plaintiff offered the testimony of his brother, who offered to testify regarding their parents’ statements regarding the plaintiff's age. The court refused to admit this testimony, ruling that it constituted inadmissible hearsay.

The underlying dispute, as with so many early colonial cases, was over ownership of land, but Dallas's report does not specify where in the Pennsylvania colony it was located. The defendant (presumably, Robeson) relied on a colonial Chancery Court decree as evidence of his title to the land. However, the Pennsylvania Provincial Act creating the Chancery Court had been repealed by the King and the Council. (King George and his Council often repealed acts of colonial legislatures, especially those acts creating instruments of independent government, or otherwise asserting the rights of colonists.) The Chancery Court's decree regarding the disputed title had been issued after the King and Council had repealed the Act, but before notice of such repeal reached Pennsylvania. The issue, therefore was whether the Act was effectively repealed by the date when the Chancery Court issued its decree. If it was repealed, then the Court was without legal existence, and its decree would be meaningless. If, however, the Act creating the Court was not considered repealed until notice of that repeal reached Pennsylvania, then the Chancery Court decree was still valid, and supported the defendant's title to the land.

Dallas's report indicates that the trial Court instructed the jury that the Act was not nullified until notice of that nullification was received in Pennsylvania. The jury then agreed, determining that the Chancery Court decree was valid, and finding for the defendant.

== Precedent's effect ==
Lessee of Albertson v. Robeson would be cited into the latter half of the 19th century for the proposition of the law of evidence that testimony regarding a parent's statements about the birthdate or age of that parent's child constituted hearsay. It would also be cited as authority for a court, when the passage of a statute is questioned, to look beyond the printed statute, to the circumstances surrounding its passage. Toward that end, the journals of Congress, the various state legislatures, and the British House of Lords are admissible as evidence of their proceedings.

== See also ==
- United States Reports, volume 1
