= Weston v. Stammers =

Two 1759 decisions of Pennsylvania courts

Lessee of Weston v Stammers, 1 U.S. (1 Dall.) 2 (Pa. 1759) and Lessee of Lewis v. Stammers, 1 U.S. (1 Dall.) 2 (Pa. 1759) are decisions of the Supreme Court of Pennsylvania, issued when Pennsylvania was still a British colony. They are among the first decisions that appear in the first volume of United States Reports.

== Colonial and Early State Court Cases in the United States Reports ==
None of the decisions appearing in the first volume and most of the second volume of the United States Reports are actually decisions of the United States Supreme Court. Instead, they are decisions from various Pennsylvania courts, dating from the colonial period and the first decade after Independence. Alexander Dallas, a Philadelphia, Pennsylvania lawyer and journalist, had been in the business of reporting these cases for newspapers and periodicals. He subsequently began compiling his case reports in a bound volume, which he called "Reports of cases ruled and adjudged in the courts of Pennsylvania, before and since the Revolution". This would come to be known as the first volume of "Dallas Reports."

When the United States Supreme Court, along with the rest of the new Federal Government, moved in 1791 to the nation's temporary capital in Philadelphia, Dallas was appointed the Supreme Court's first unofficial and unpaid Supreme Court Reporter. (Court reporters in that age received no salary, but were expected to profit from the publication and sale of their compiled decisions.) Dallas continued to collect and publish Pennsylvania decisions in a second volume of his Reports, and when the Supreme Court began hearing cases, he added those cases to his reports, starting towards the end of the second volume, "2 Dallas Reports". Dallas would go on to publish a total of 4 volumes of decisions during his tenure as Reporter.

In 1874, the U.S. government created the United States Reports, and numbered the volumes previously published privately as part of that series, starting from the first volume of Dallas Reports. The four volumes Dallas published were retitled volumes 1 - 4 of United States Reports. Thus, the complete citation to Lessee of Weston v. Stammers is 1 U.S. (1 Dall.) 2 (Pa. 1759).

== The Decisions ==
Little is known about the details of the dispute. The first decision discusses a "will" (and not a "testament" as well) and the second decision addresses title in dispute. Thus, it is likely that the dispute involved title to land in the Pennsylvania Colony, and that at least one of the parties claimed right to the land under a will. (At common law, real estate was bequeathed by use of a "will" and personal property—what was then known as "chattels"—was bequeathed by a "testament".) The issue addressed by the colonial court in the first decision was whether an exemplification of will (an official copy, certified or authenticated as a true copy, to be used as evidence) which was made in the Canterbury prerogative Court was admissible as evidence before the Pennsylvania colonial court hearing the case. The Court held that it was admissible.

The second decision involved depositions taken in a prior case, in an "inferior court" in which the "present defendant" (presumably Stammers) was also a party. The court held that the deposition from the prior case could not be used as evidence in the case at hand. The court noted that the depositions had not been read into evidence in the prior case.

The report of both decisions are quite short by today's standards; they are one sentence apiece. Thus, both appear on a single page, and both share the same citation.

In the same way that it is not clear what Court issued these decisions, it is not clear what "inferior court" handled the prior case in which the deposition was taken.

== See also ==
- United States Reports, volume 1
