= Lessee of Hyam v. Edwards =

Two decisions of the colonial Supreme Court of Pennsylvania

Lessee of Hyam v. Edwards, is the title of two separate decisions of the Supreme Court of Pennsylvania, issued when Pennsylvania was still a British colony. The first decision is found at 1 U.S. (1 Dall.) 1 (Pa. 1759) and is the first decision that appears in the first volume of United States Reports. The second decision is found at 1 U.S. (1 Dall.) 2 (Pa. 1759).

== Colonial court decisions in the United States Reports ==
None of the decisions appearing in the first volume and few of the second volume of the United States Reports are actually decisions of the United States Supreme Court. Instead, they are decisions from various Pennsylvania courts, dating from the colonial period and the first decade after Independence. Alexander Dallas, a Philadelphia lawyer and journalist, had been in the business of publishing and selling such cases for newspapers and periodicals. He subsequently began compiling and selling the cases in a bound volume, which he called "Reports of cases ruled and adjudged in the courts of Pennsylvania, before and since the Revolution". This would come to be known as the first volume of Dallas Reports.

When the United States Supreme Court, along with the rest of the new Federal Government, moved in 1791 to the nation's temporary capital in Philadelphia, Dallas was appointed the Court's first unofficial and unpaid Supreme Court Reporter. (Court reporters in that age received no salary, but were allowed compensation in the form of profits from the publication and sale of compiled decisions.) Dallas continued to collect and publish Pennsylvania decisions in a second volume of his Reports, and when the Supreme Court began hearing cases he added those cases to his reports, starting towards the end of the second volume. Dallas would go on to publish a total of four volumes of decisions during his tenure as Reporter.

In 1874, the U.S. government created the United States Reports, and numbered the volumes previously published privately as part of that series, starting from the first volume of Dallas Reports. The four volumes Dallas published were retitled volumes 1 - 4 of United States Reports. Thus, the complete citation to the first decision in Hyam's Lessee v. Edwards is 1 U.S. (1 Dall.) 1 (Pa. 1759).

== The decisions ==
Little is known about the details of the dispute in this case beyond the fact that at least two parties appear to have claimed ownership of some parcel of land located in the Pennsylvania Colony, and one claim appears to have been based on inheritance from a deceased prior owner. The issue resolved by the first decision was whether a title deed to land in the Colony, executed in England, registered ("inrolled") in the King's Bench, and notarized ("proved") before the Lord Mayor of the City of London, could be admitted as evidence in a trial in the Pennsylvania territorial court regarding disputed land. The Pennsylvania colonial court held that such a deed was admissible in evidence.

The issue resolved by the second decision was whether a copy of the "Register of Births and Deaths of People Called Quakers" proved (certified) to be a true one before the same Lord Mayor of the City of London, could be offered into evidence in a trial in Pennsylvania, for the purpose of establishing the death of a person so listed. The Court held that the copy could be so used.
