= Pennsylvania courts of common pleas =

Trial courts of the Unified Judicial System of Pennsylvania

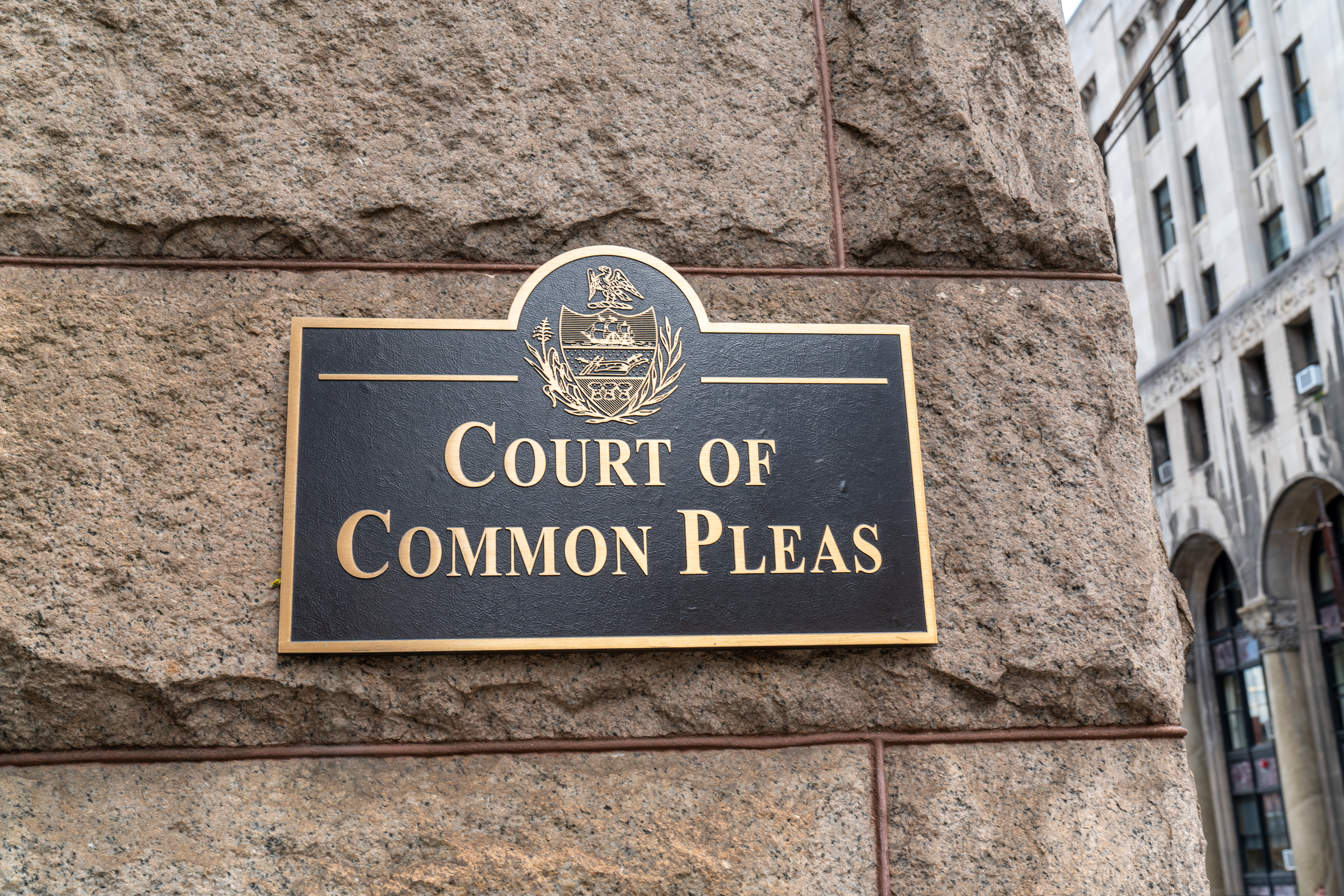
Court of Common Pleas, Allegheny County Family Law Center, Pittsburgh

In Pennsylvania, the courts of common pleas are the trial courts of the Unified Judicial System of Pennsylvania (the state court system).

The courts of common pleas are the trial courts of general jurisdiction in the state. The name derives from the medieval English court of Common Pleas. Pennsylvania established them in 1722.

They hear civil cases with a significant amount in controversy and trials for serious crimes. They have original jurisdiction over all cases not exclusively assigned to another court and appellate jurisdiction over judgments from the minor courts (which include the magisterial district courts in all counties but Philadelphia, the Philadelphia Municipal Court and Pittsburgh Municipal Court). They also hear appeals from certain state and most local government agencies.

The courts are established by Article V, Section 5 of the Pennsylvania Constitution:

There shall be one court of common pleas for each judicial district (a) having such divisions and consisting of such number of judges as shall be provided by law, one of whom shall be the president judge; and (b) having unlimited original jurisdiction in all cases except as may otherwise be provided by law.

The courts of common pleas are organized into 60 judicial districts, 53 comprising one of Pennsylvania's 67 counties, and seven comprising two counties.

Each district has from one to 101 judges. Judges of the common pleas courts are elected to ten-year terms. A president judge and a court administrator serve in each judicial district. In districts with seven or fewer judges, the president judge with the longest continuous service holds this position. In districts with eight or more judges, the president judge is elected to a five-year term by the court.

== Judicial districts ==
1. Philadelphia County
2. Lancaster County
3. Northampton County
4. Tioga County
5. Allegheny County
6. Erie County
7. Bucks County
8. Northumberland County
9. Cumberland County
10. Westmoreland County
11. Luzerne County
12. Dauphin County
13. Greene County
14. Fayette County
15. Chester County
16. Somerset County
17. Snyder County and Union County
18. Clarion County
19. York County
20. Huntingdon County
21. Schuylkill County
22. Wayne County
23. Berks County
24. Blair County
25. Clinton County
26. Columbia County and Montour County
27. Washington County
28. Venango County
29. Lycoming County
30. Crawford County
31. Lehigh County
32. Delaware County
33. Armstrong County
34. Susquehanna County
35. Mercer County
36. Beaver County
37. Forest County and Warren County
38. Montgomery County
39. Franklin County and Fulton County
40. Indiana County
41. Juniata County and Perry County
42. Bradford County
43. Monroe County
44. Sullivan County and Wyoming County
45. Lackawanna County
46. Clearfield County
47. Cambria County
48. McKean County
49. Centre County
50. Butler County
51. Adams County
52. Lebanon County
53. Lawrence County
54. Jefferson County
55. Potter County
56. Carbon County
57. Bedford County
58. Mifflin County
59. Cameron County and Elk County
60. Pike County

== See also ==
- List of state and county courthouses in Pennsylvania
